= Historic districts in Meridian, Mississippi =

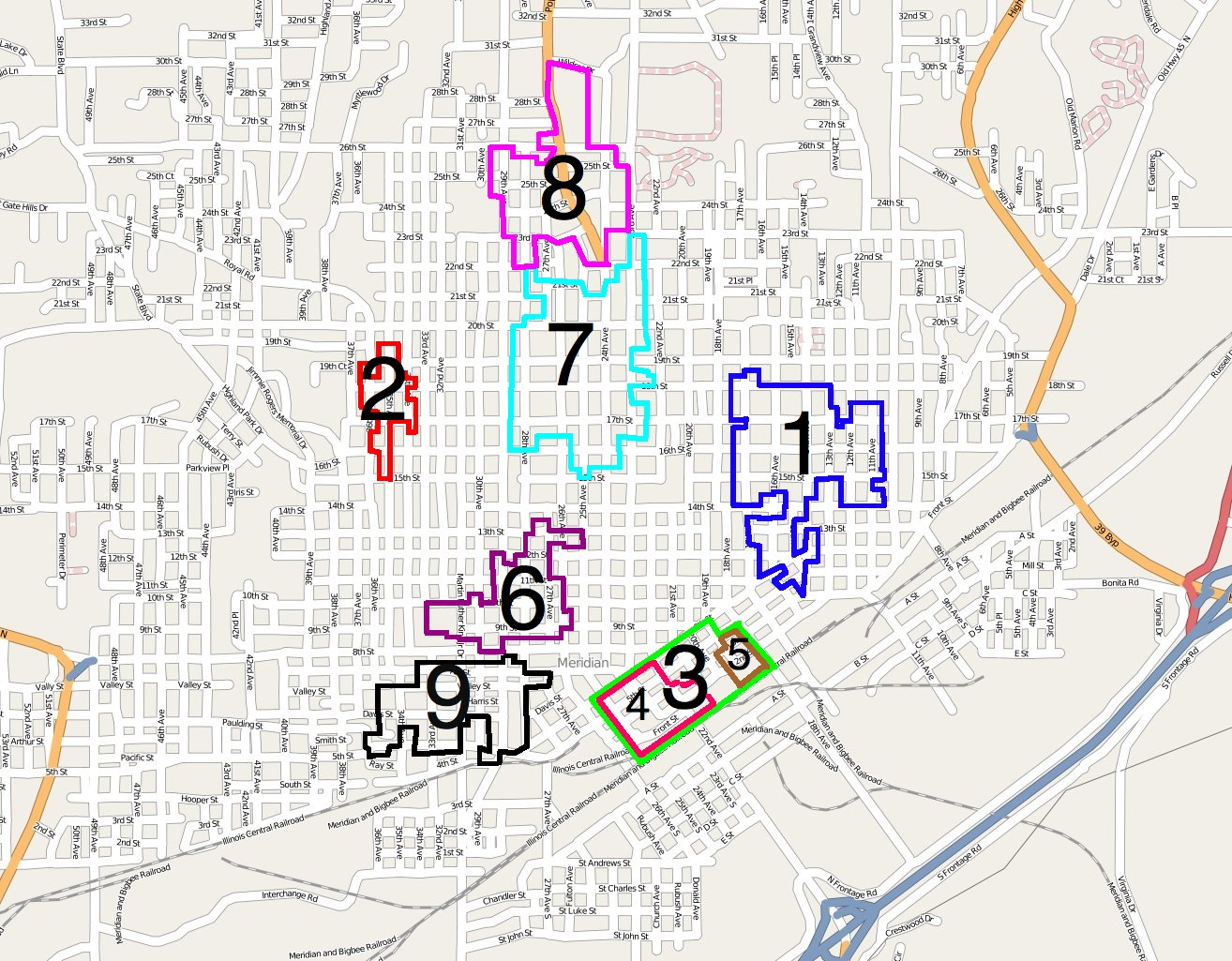
1 East End Historic District; 2 Highlands Historic District; 3 Meridian Downtown Historic District; 4 Meridian Urban Center Historic District; 5 Union Station Historic District; 6 Merrehope Historic District; 7 Mid-Town Historic District; 8 Poplar Springs Road Historic District; 9 West End Historic District

There are nine historic districts in Meridian, Mississippi. Each of these districts is listed on the National Register of Historic Places. One district, Meridian Downtown Historic District, is a combination of two older districts, Meridian Urban Center Historic District and Union Station Historic District. Many architectural styles are present in the districts, most from the late 19th century and early 20th century, including Queen Anne, Colonial Revival, Italianate, Art Deco, Late Victorian, and Bungalow.

== East End Historic District ==
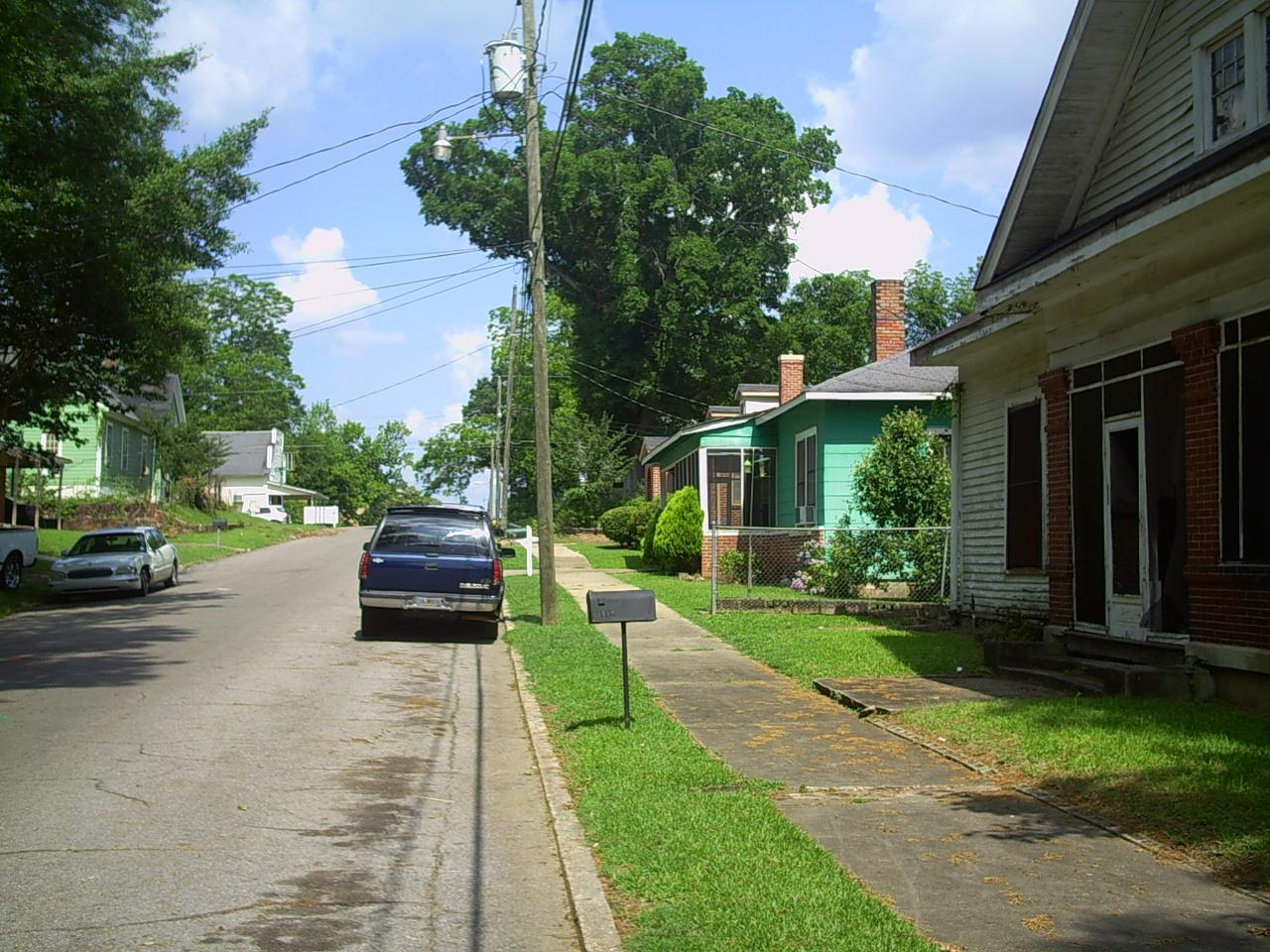
Looking down 16th Street

East End Historic District is roughly bounded by 18th St on the north, 11th Ave on the east, 14th St on the south, and 17th Ave on the west. A semi-triangular shaped section extends from the southern edge roughly occupying the area between 16th and 14th Avenues. The 970-acre (3.9 km^{2}) district was added to the National Register of Historic Places on August 21, 1987. The district's significance lies in its large collection of Queen Anne–style and Colonial Revival–style cottages built between 1890 and 1910 during Meridian's "Golden Age." Sixty percent of the buildings in the district are from this time period, representing Meridian's rapid eastward growth along the railroad lines after the American Civil War. This growth was made possible by the development of transportation, industrial, and commercial sectors of the city's economy.

Richard McLemore, one of the founders of the city, built his first cabin just outside the district and claimed much of the area in the district to be part of his cotton plantation. In 1839 he established a cemetery (now listed on the National Register of Historic Places as McLemore Cemetery), which is Meridian's earliest remaining historic site. In 1853 Lewis Ragsdale, another one of Meridian's founders, purchased much of McLemore's plantation and subdivided it, giving rise to the many residences in this district. Because of textile and planing businesses located along a streetcar line, 16th Ave became a major north–south route through the city and was the first street in the city to be paved.

Structures identified as pivotal to the nature of the district include:

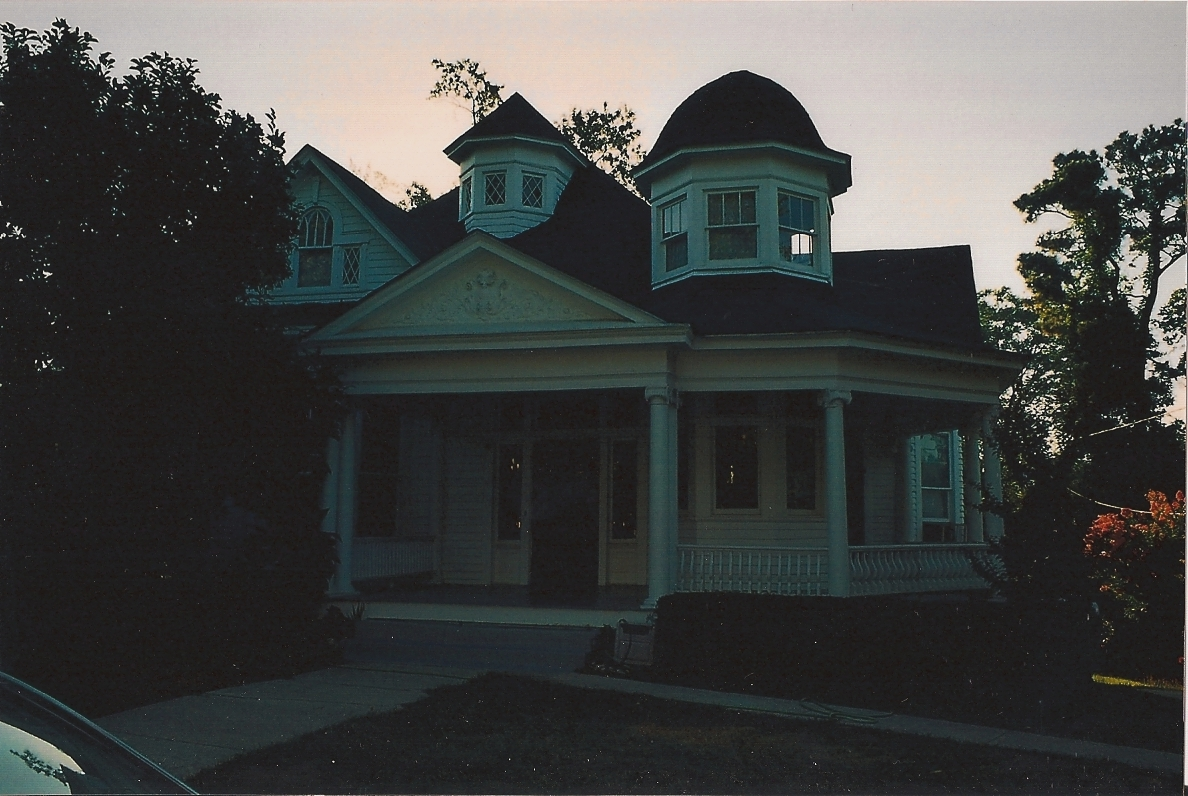
1. 1512 14th Avenue – One-story Queen Anne–style wooden residence.
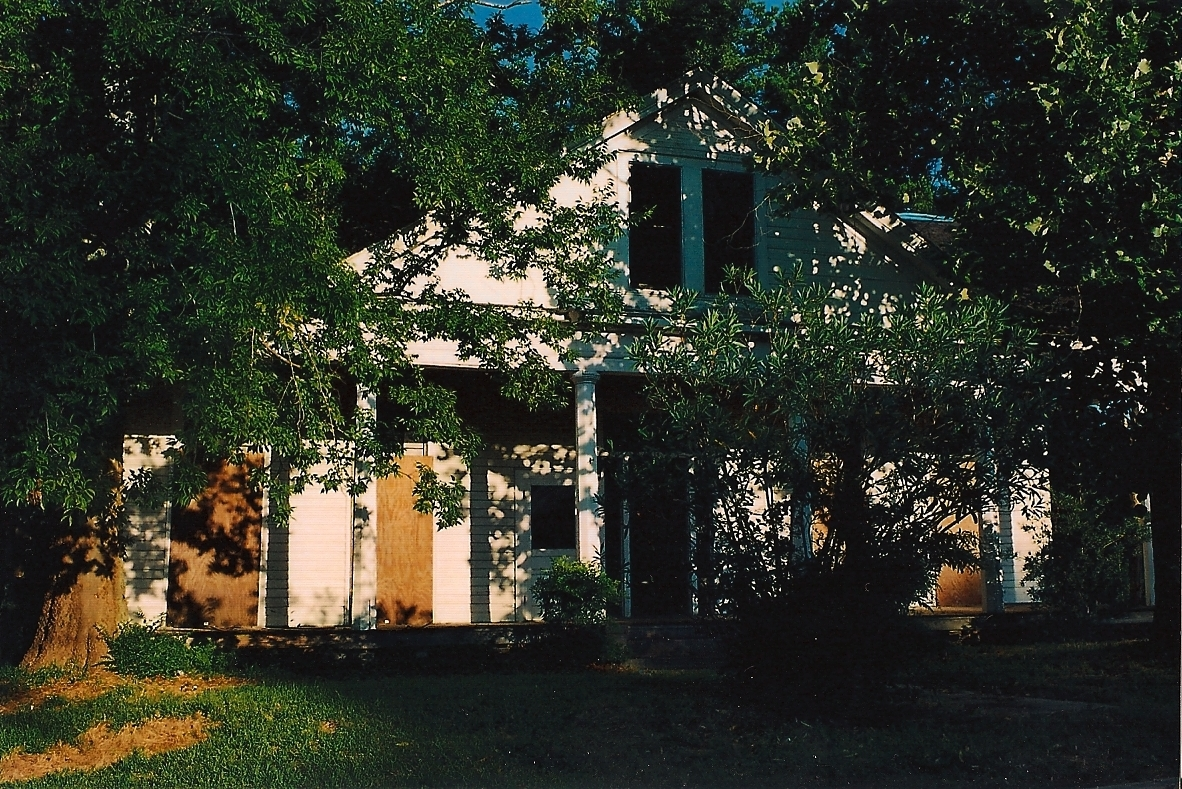
2. 1513 14th Avenue – 1 1/2-story Gothic Revival–style wooden residence.

== Highlands Historic District ==
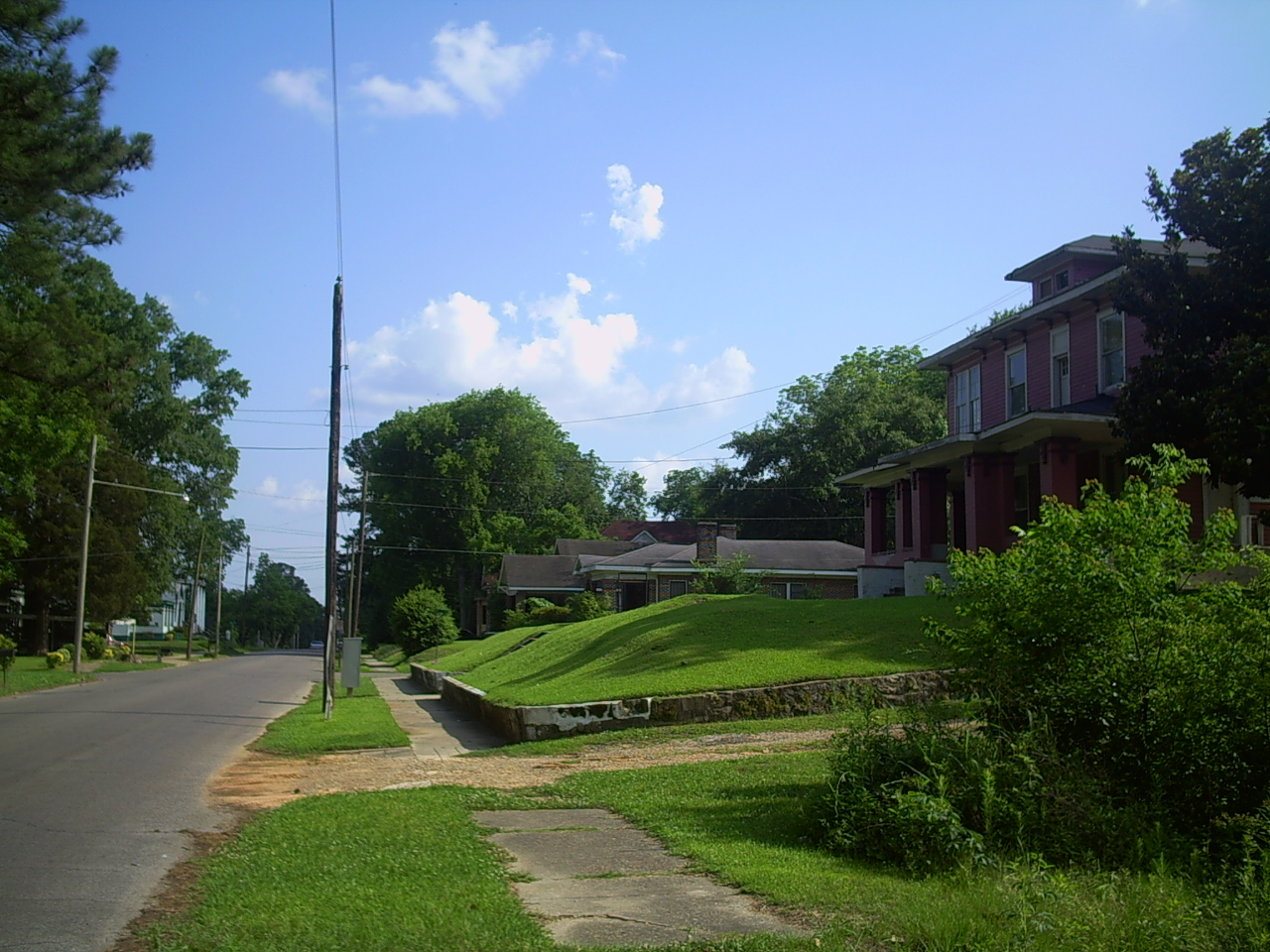
Looking down 35th Avenue

Highlands Historic District (also called Red Line) is roughly bounded by 19th St on the north, 34th Ave on the east, 9th St on the south, and 36th Ave on the west. The area was originally known as Missouri Ridge because Union soldiers, primarily from Missouri, camped in the area and were engaged in the Battle of Meridian during the Civil War. The district grew from the introduction of Meridian's light rail streetcar system in 1883. The particular streetcar line servicing the area was known as the "Red Line"; the area shares that name as well. The rail line it began on 8th Street, continued up 34th Avenue, then turned west between 19th and 20th Streets and continued into Highland Park, just outside the western boundary of the district. The streetcar line provided transportation in and to the area that allowed it to develop. The 220-acre (0.89 km^{2}) district was added to the National Register of Historic Places on August 21, 1987.

The district is overwhelmingly residential, with over 90% of its structures being homes; the exceptions are 3 churches, a daycare center and a convenience store. A typical residence in the district is an early 20th-century cottage with an independently roofed porch. Most buildings in the district were built just after the turn of the 20th century, but building dates range from the late 1890s to the early 1930s. Architectural styles of the cottages include Queen Anne, Eastlake, and Colonial Revival. Some of the buildings' porches were remodelled in the 1920s using American Craftsman architecture.

Buildings identified as pivotal to the nature of the district include:

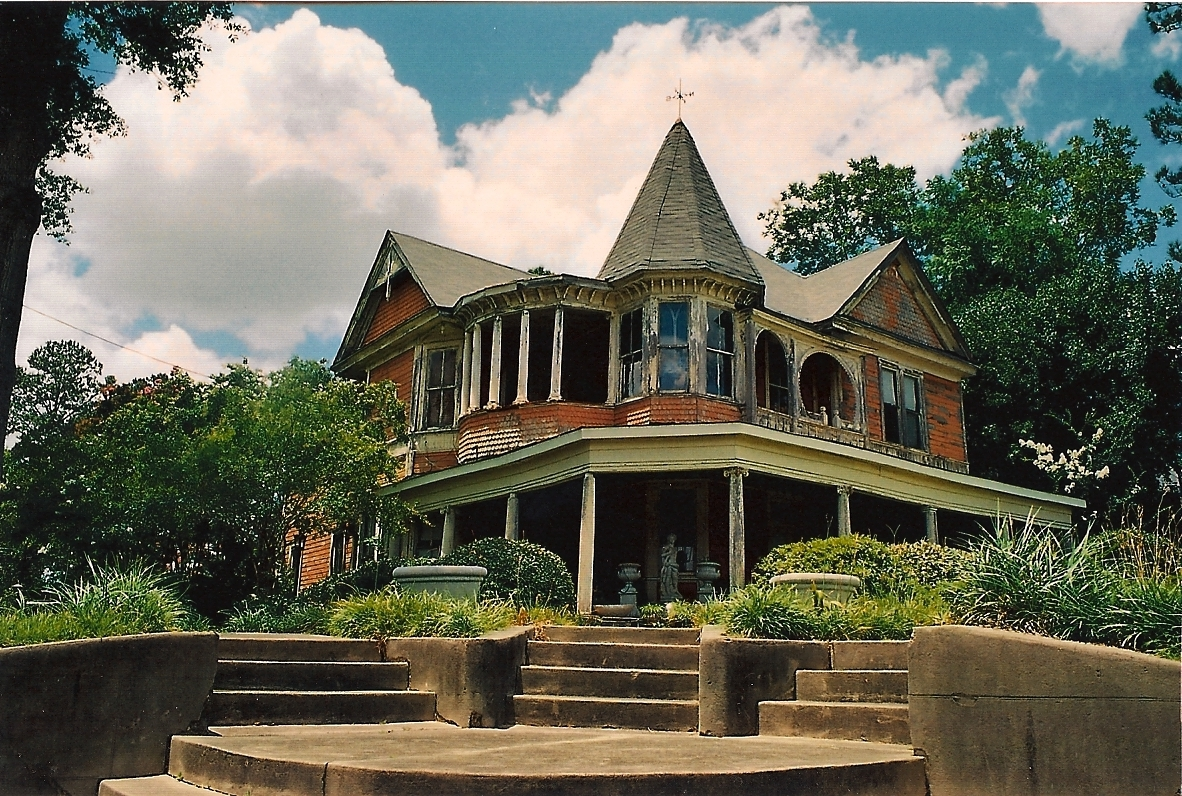
1. 1803 35th Ave – Two-story Queen Anne style wooden residence.
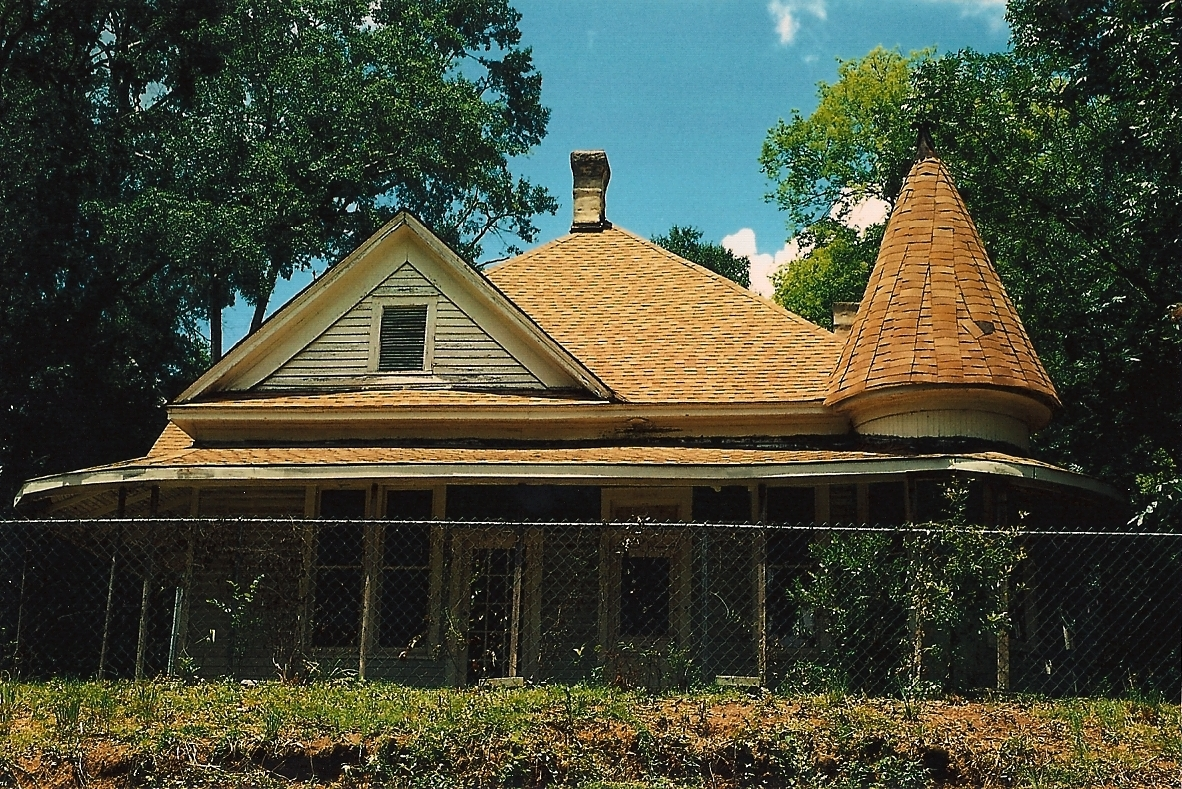
2. 3504 16th St – One-story Queen Anne style wooden residence.

== Meridian Downtown Historic District ==
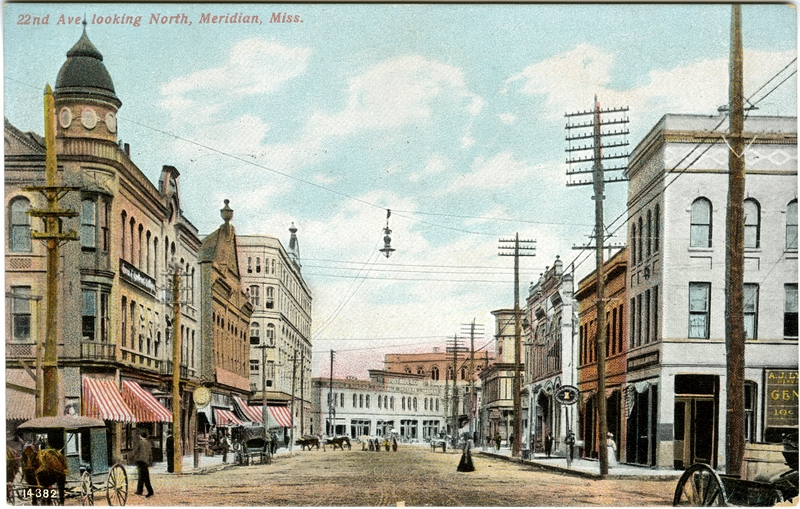
Downtown Meridian in the early 1900s

Meridian Downtown Historic District runs from the former Gulf, Mobile and Ohio Railroad tracks north to 6th St between 18th and 26th Avenues, excluding Ragsdale Survey Block 71 on the northeastern tip of the district. The district was created in 2005 to combine two older districts, Meridian Urban Center Historic District and Union Station Historic District. Meridian's city council voted to combine these two districts and the nine blocks between them into one large district, which was added to the National Register of Historic Places on January 16, 2007.

Meridian's downtown was originally divided into a central business district and an industrial zone. The business district made up much of the old Urban Center Historic District, while Union Station Historic District was the industrial zone. The buildings in downtown Meridian represent almost then entire history of the city, ranging from around 1870 to the mid-1950s. The buildings are associated with periods of economic growth, including Meridian's urban emergence in the 1880s, a transportation boom with the building of Union Station in 1906, industrial growth in 1913, struggles during the Great Depression, and transportation, industrial, and commercial maintenance in the 1940s and 1950s. Architectural styles in the district include Italianate, Spanish Colonial Revival, Romanesque, Art Deco, and Commercial minimalist architecture.

The western part of the district, centered on the intersection of 25th Ave and 4th and 5th Streets, has a close connection to the African-American community in the city. Important African-American commercial landmarks include the E. F. Young Hotel and the Fielder and Brooks Drug Store, inside which a COFO office was located during the American Civil Rights Movement of the 1960s.

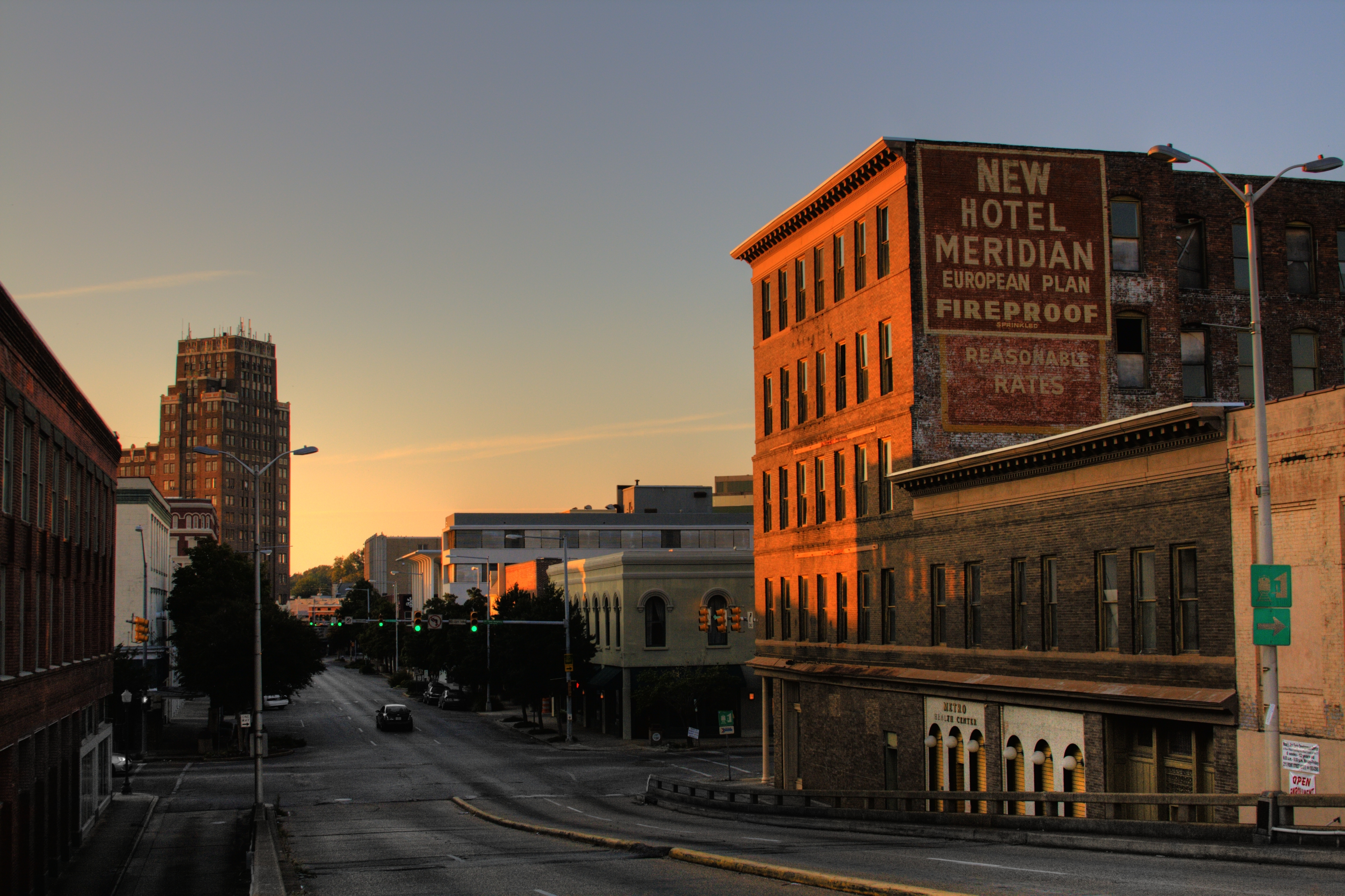
Looking from the 22nd Avenue Bridge into Downtown Meridian

Contributing properties to this district which are also listed on the National Register include:

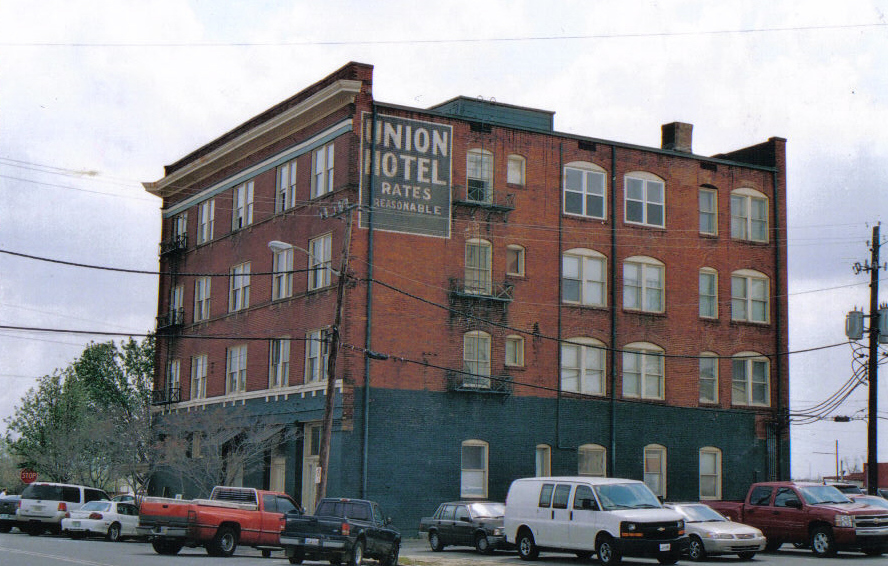
1. Union Hotel (2000 Front St)
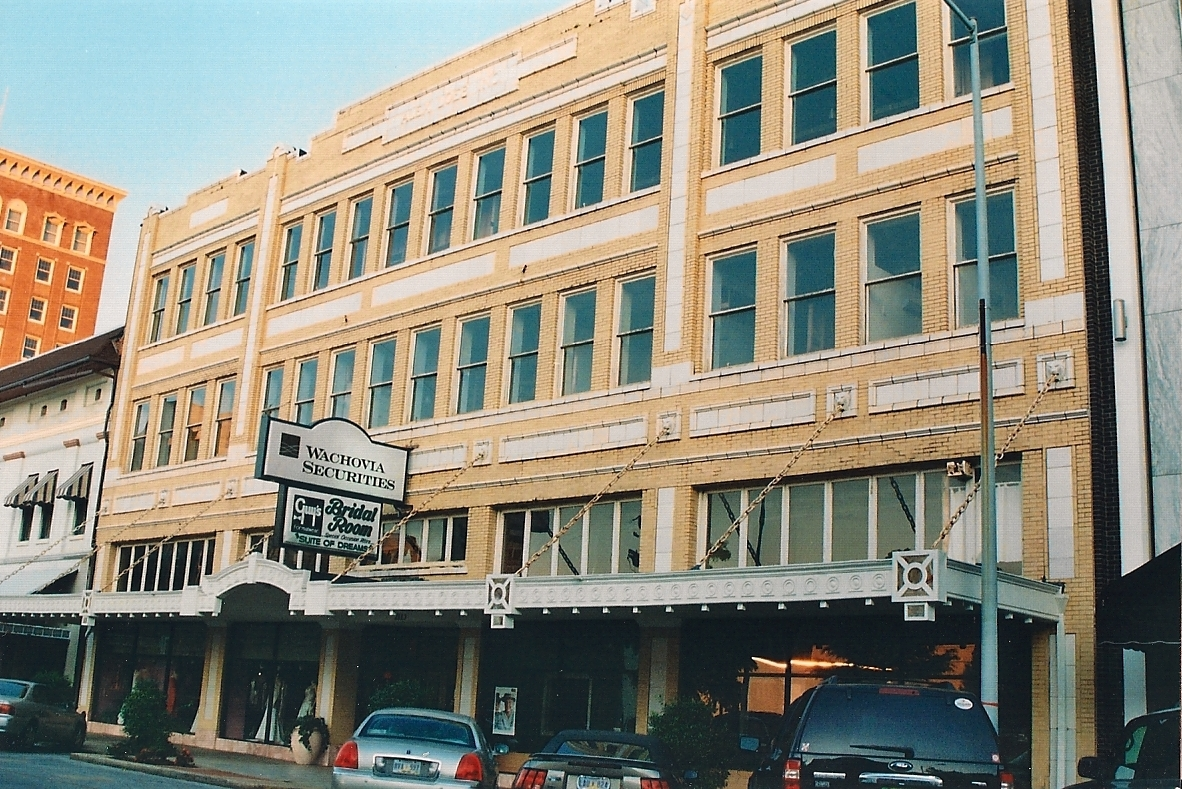
2. Alex Loeb Building (2115 5th St)
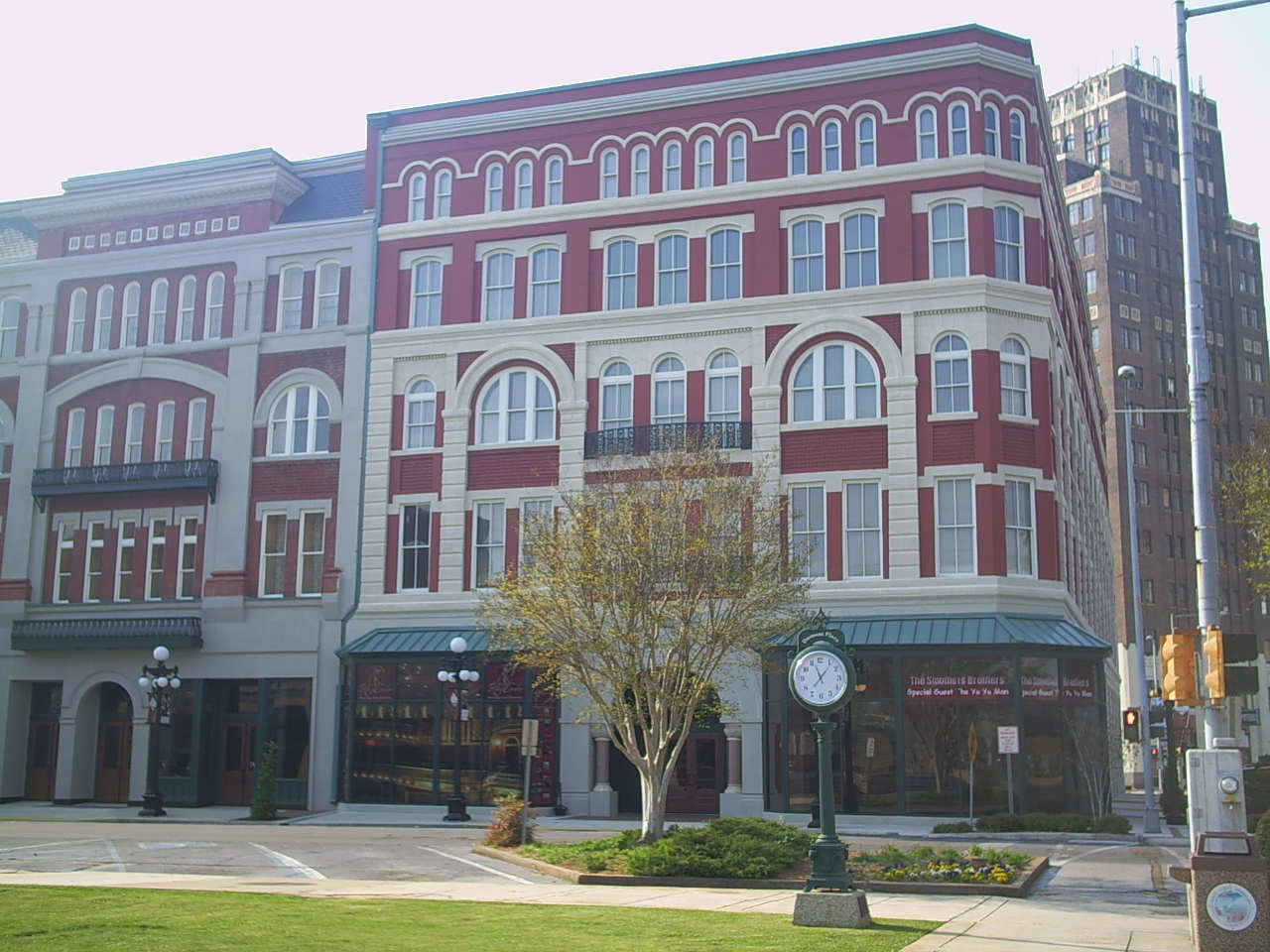
3. Grand Opera House (2208 5th St)
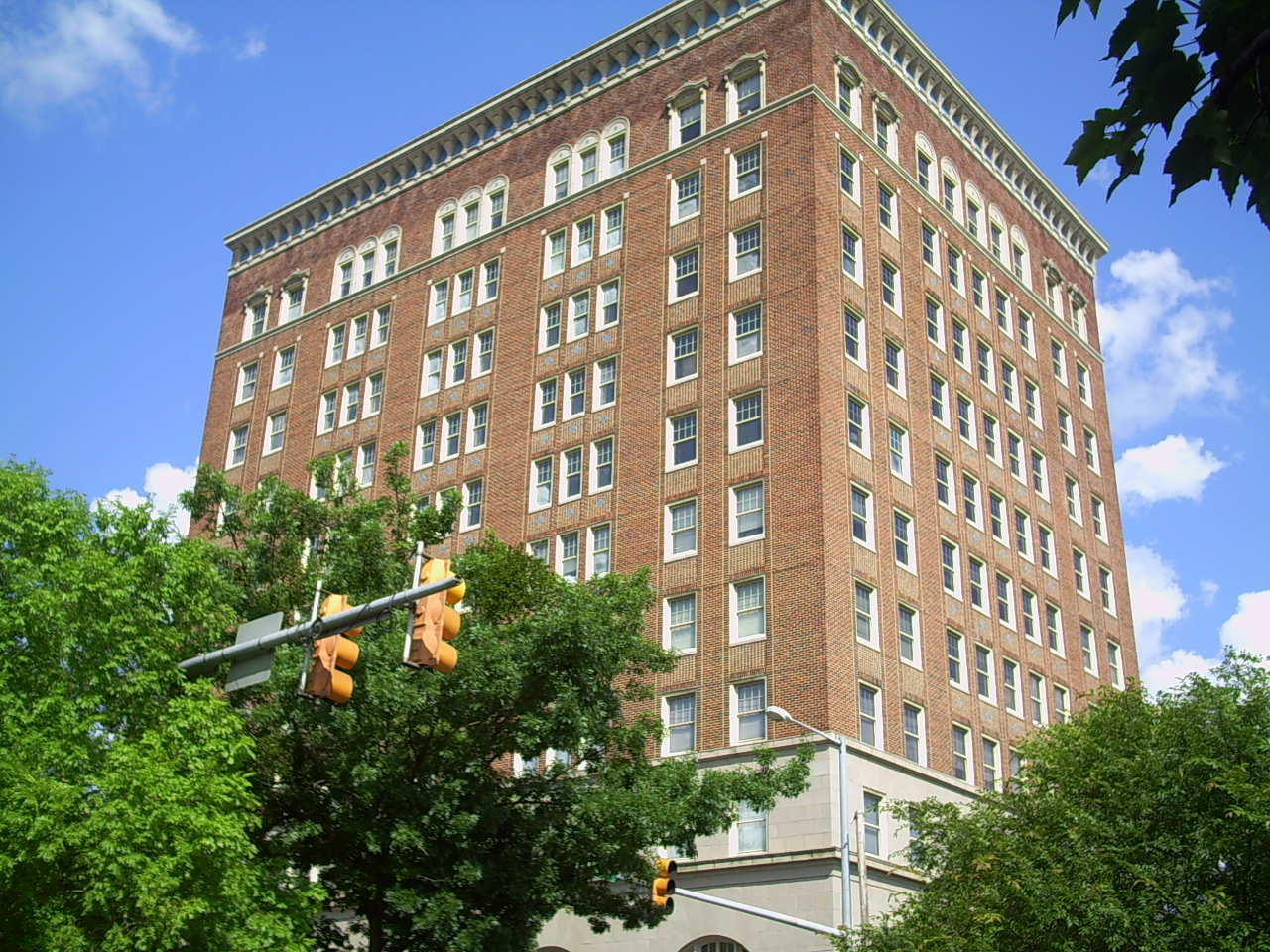
4. Lamar Hotel (410 21st St)
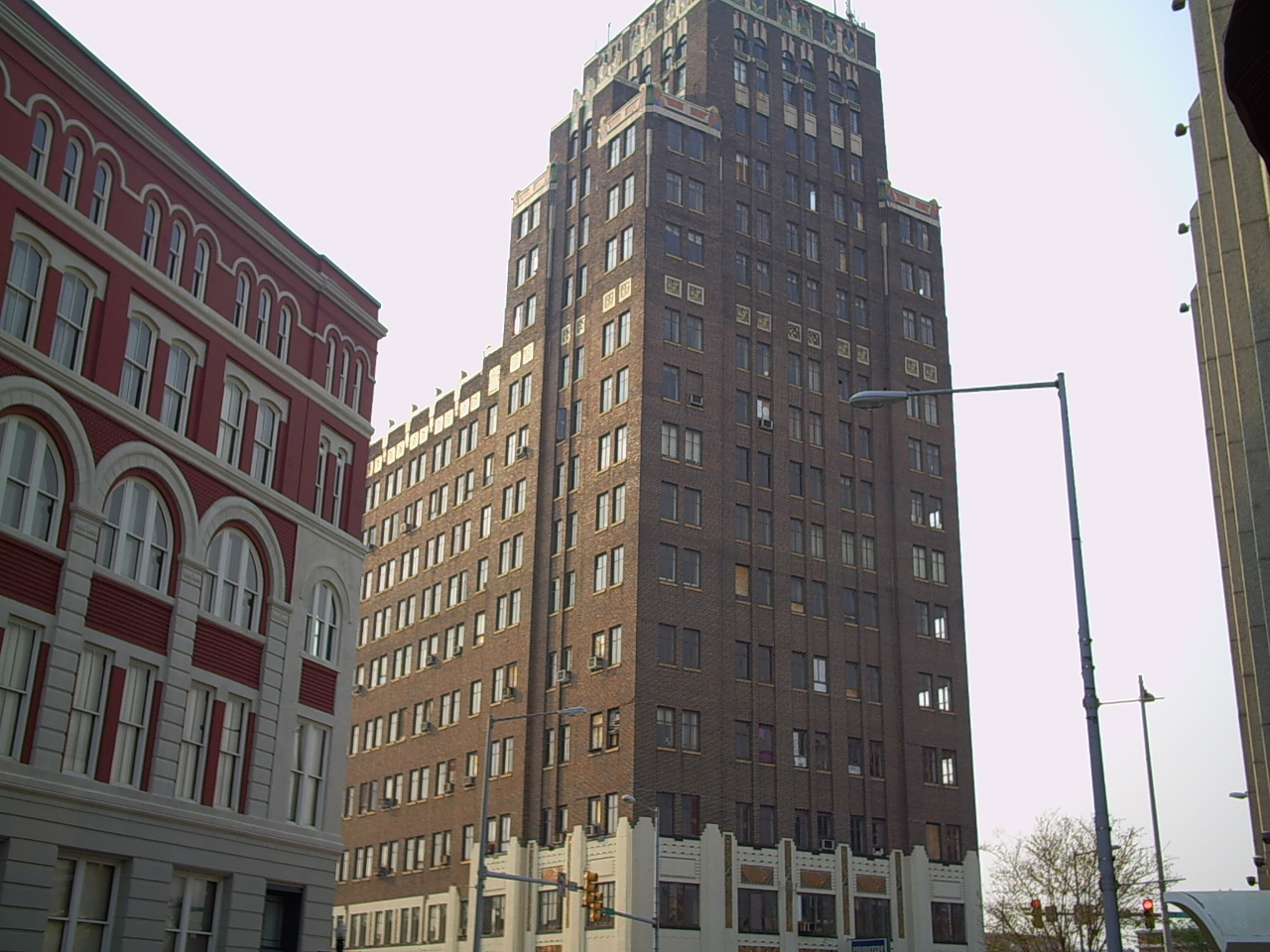
5. Threefoot Building (601 22nd Ave)

Notable contributing properties not previously listed in either of the constituent districts include:

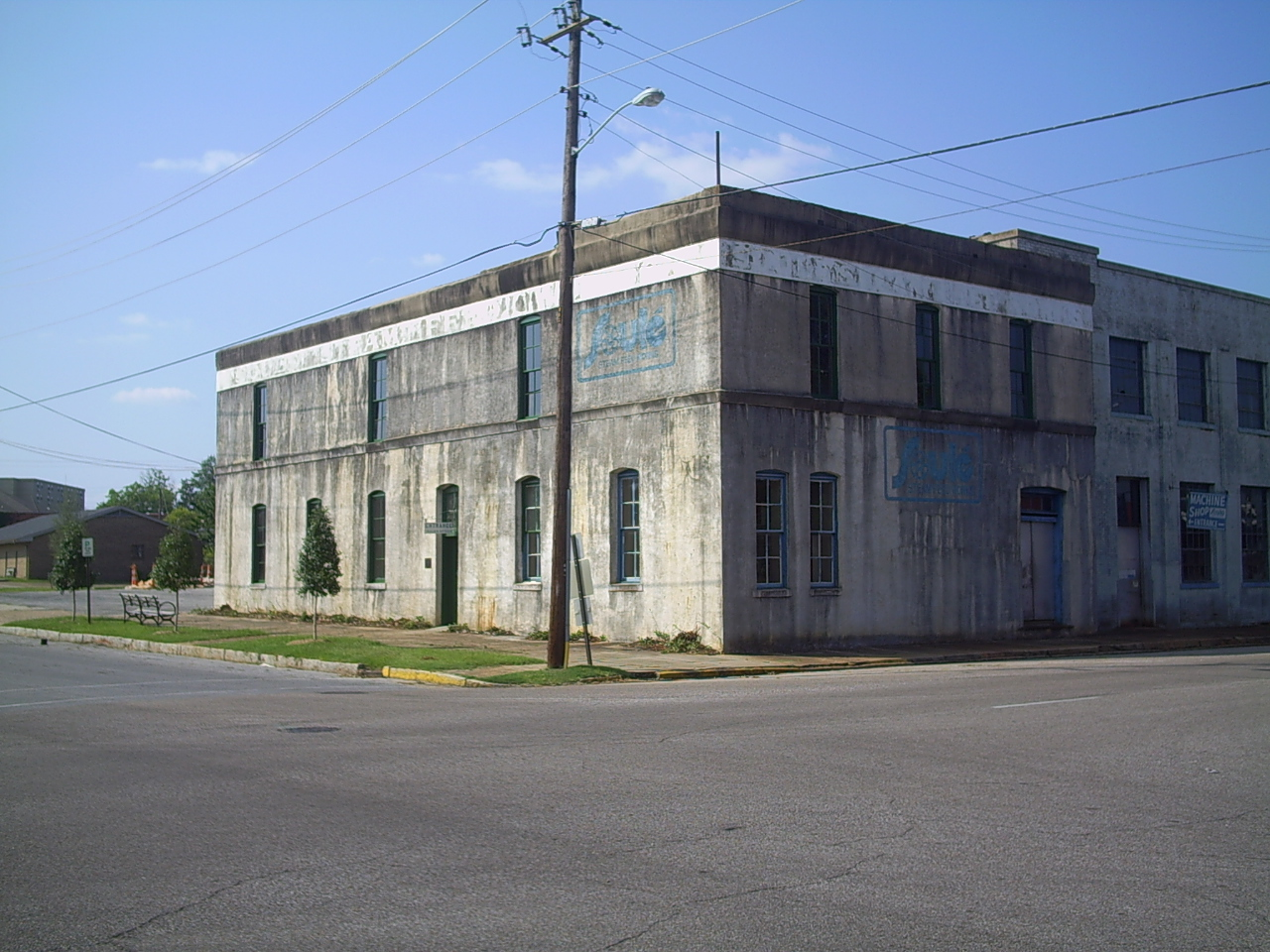
1. Soulé Steam Feed Works Machine Shop Annex (1804 4th St)
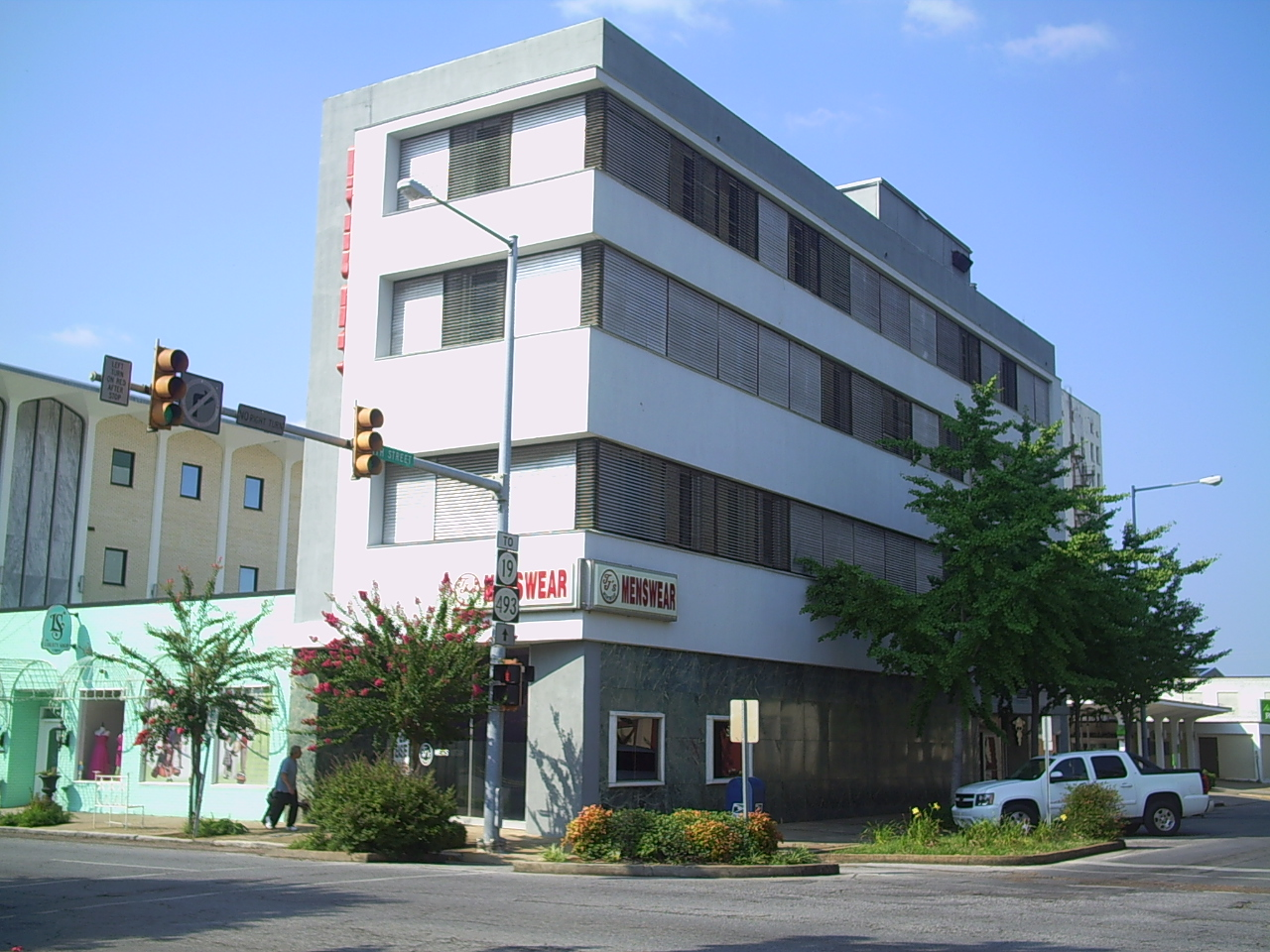
2. Vise Clinic (2120 4th St)
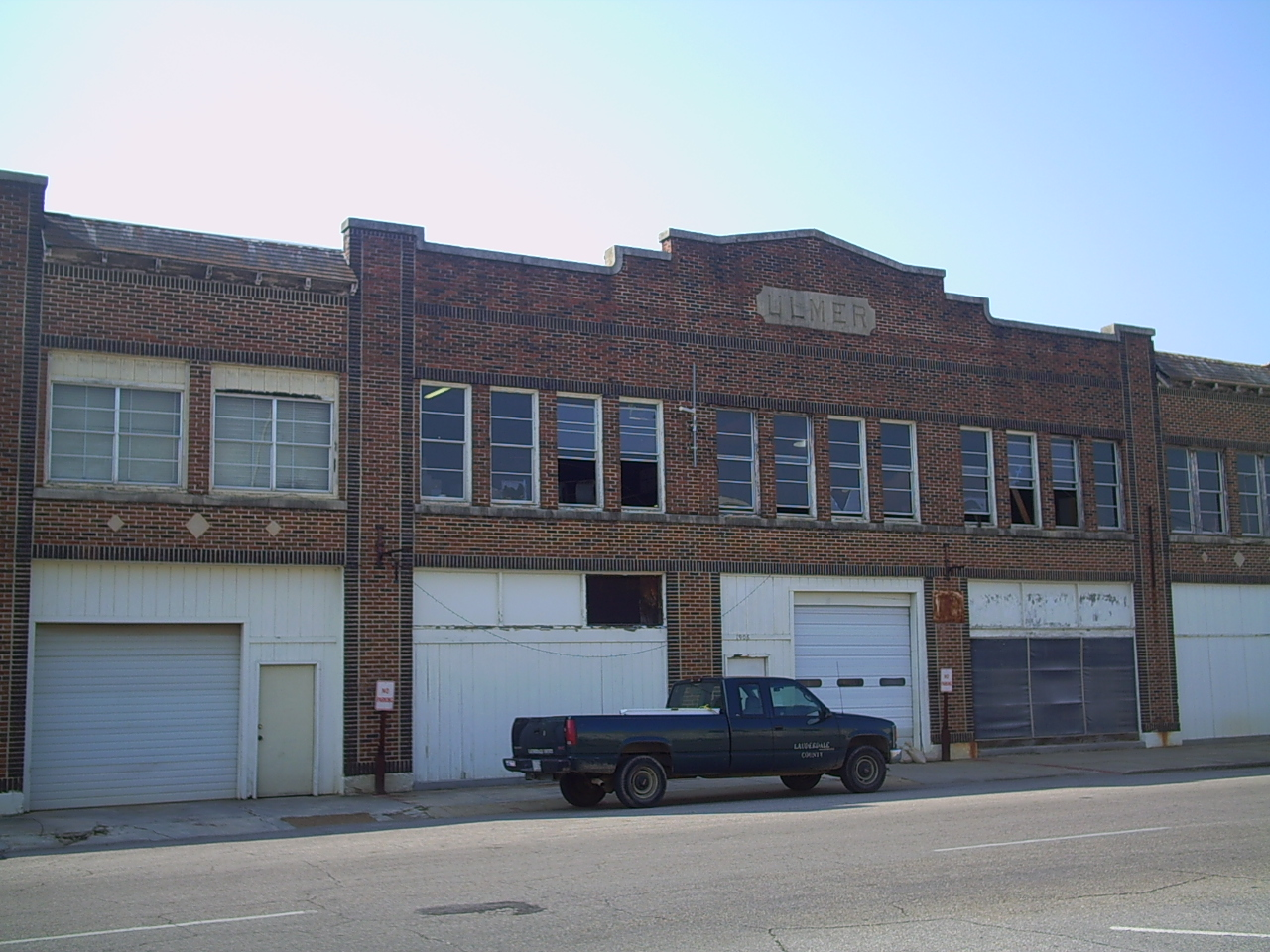
3. Ulmer Building (1906 5th St)
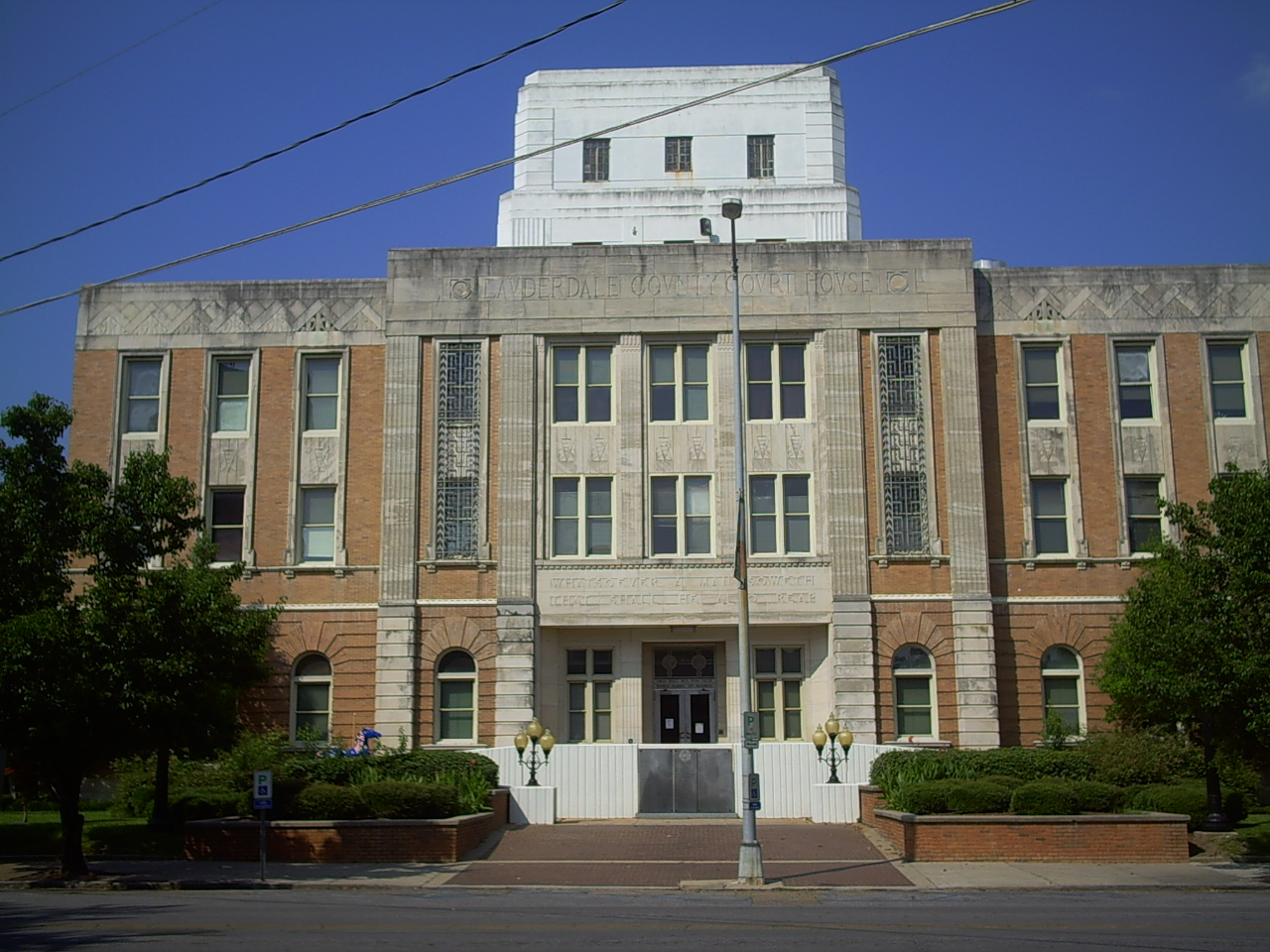
4. Lauderdale County Courthouse (500 21st Ave)
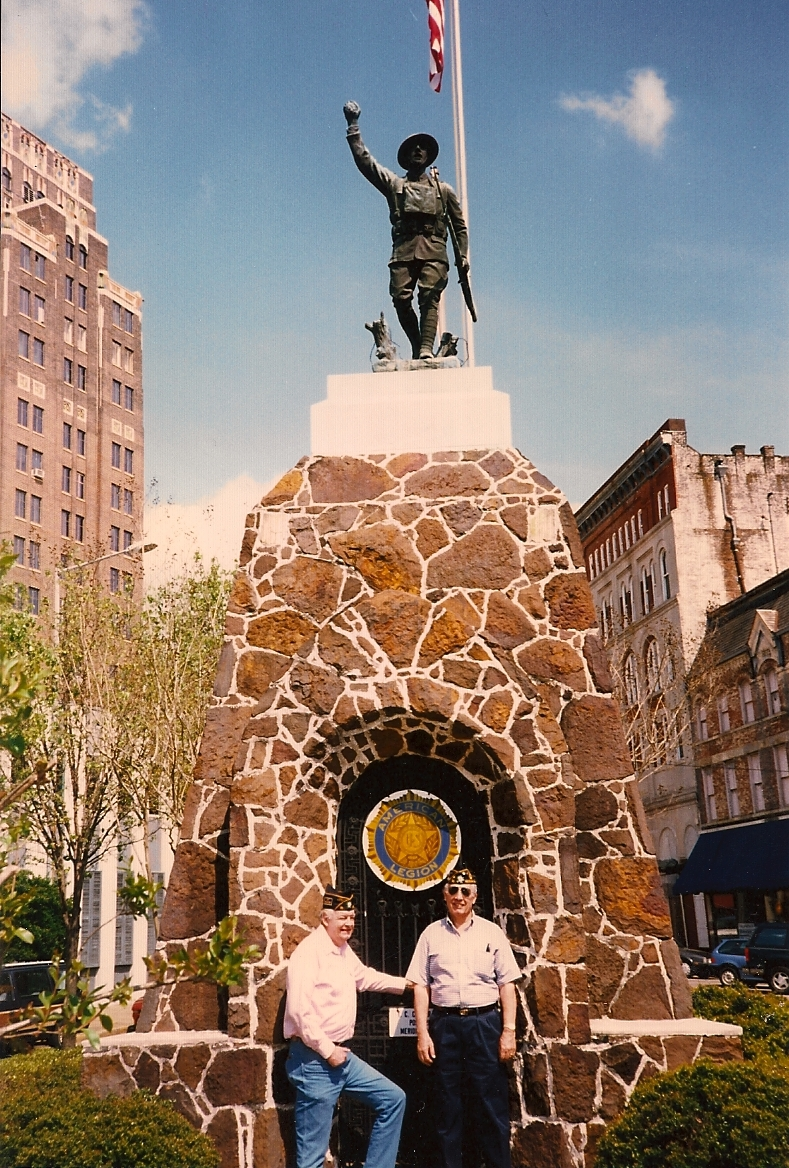
5. Doughboy Monument (Intersection of 23rd Ave and 6th St)

=== Meridian Urban Center Historic District ===
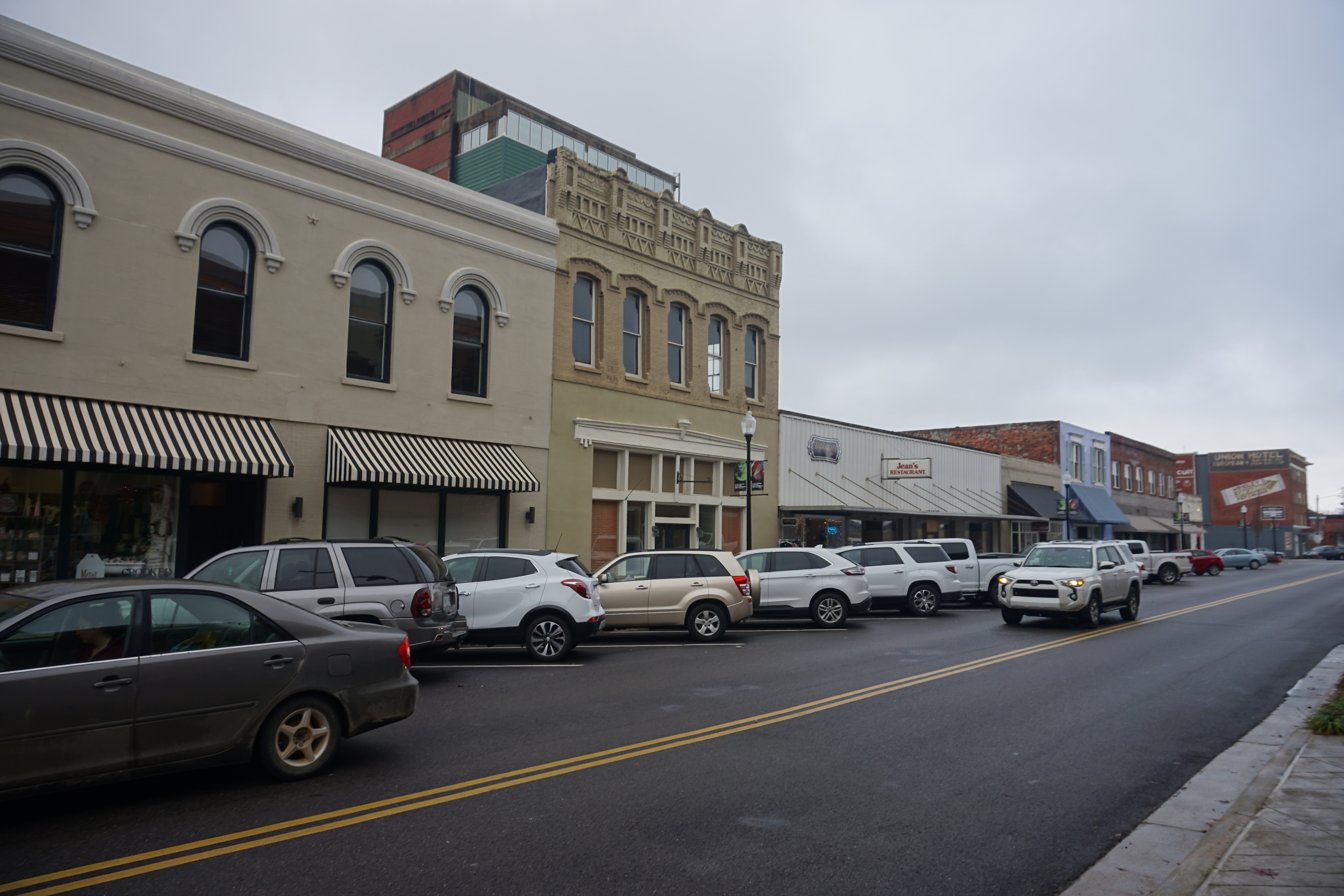
Row of buildings on Front Street

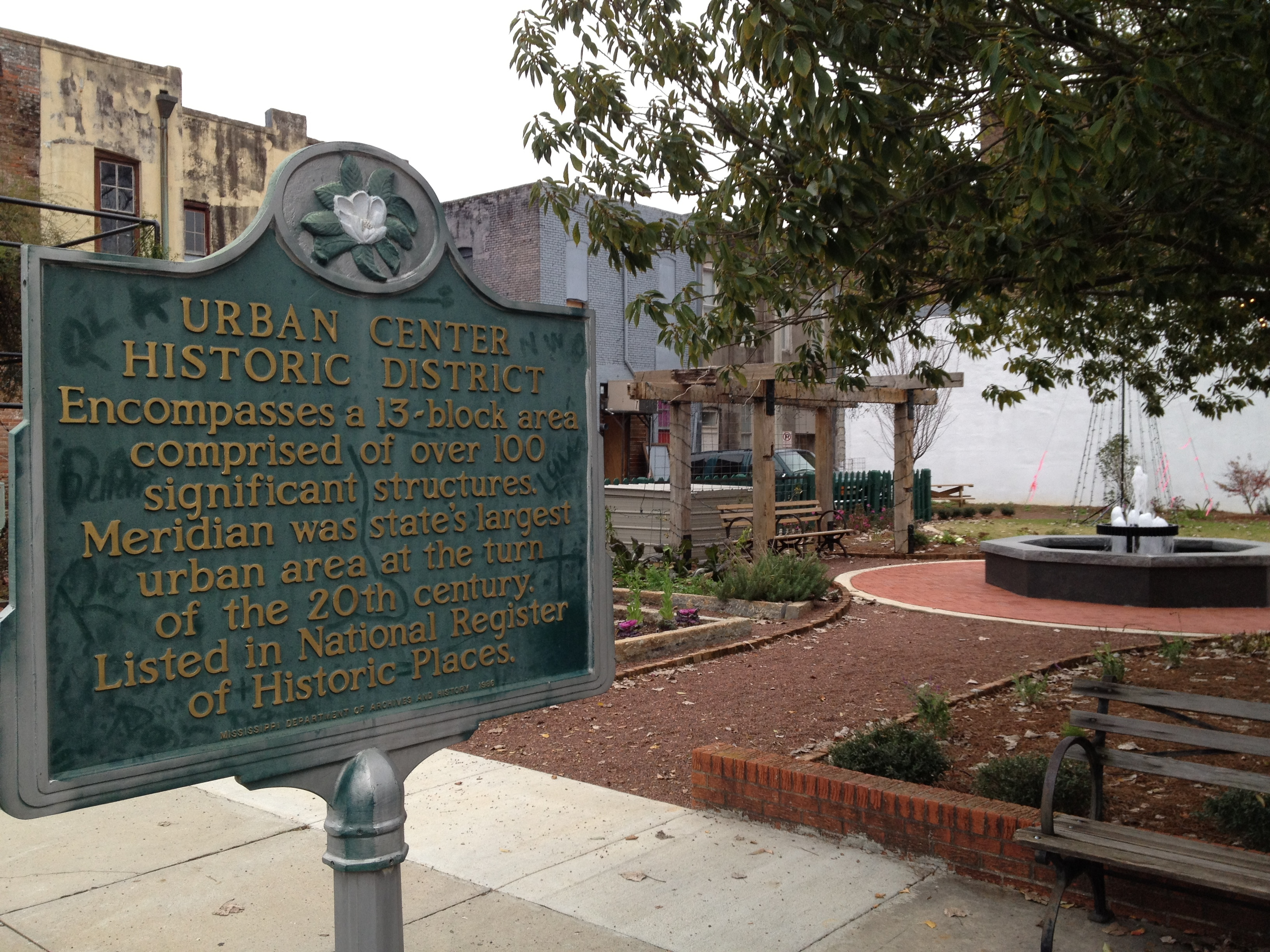
Urban Center Historic District sign in front of downtown park

The former Meridian Urban Center Historic District encompassed the area between 21st and 25th Aves, stretching from the railroad tracks north to 6th St. In 1872, 25th Avenue was the principal north–south axis in Meridian, and the streets running parallel to the tracks (Front, 4th, and 5th streets) were just beginning to develop around the new railroads. Commercial success built on railroading resulted in a large range of late 19th and early 20th Century architectural styles from Italianate row buildings to an Art Deco skyscraper known as the Threefoot Building. The 230-acre (0.93 km^{2}) district was originally added to the National Register of Historic Places on December 18, 1979, and was later combined with Union Station Historic District in 2005 to become Meridian Downtown Historic District.

Notable contributing properties include:

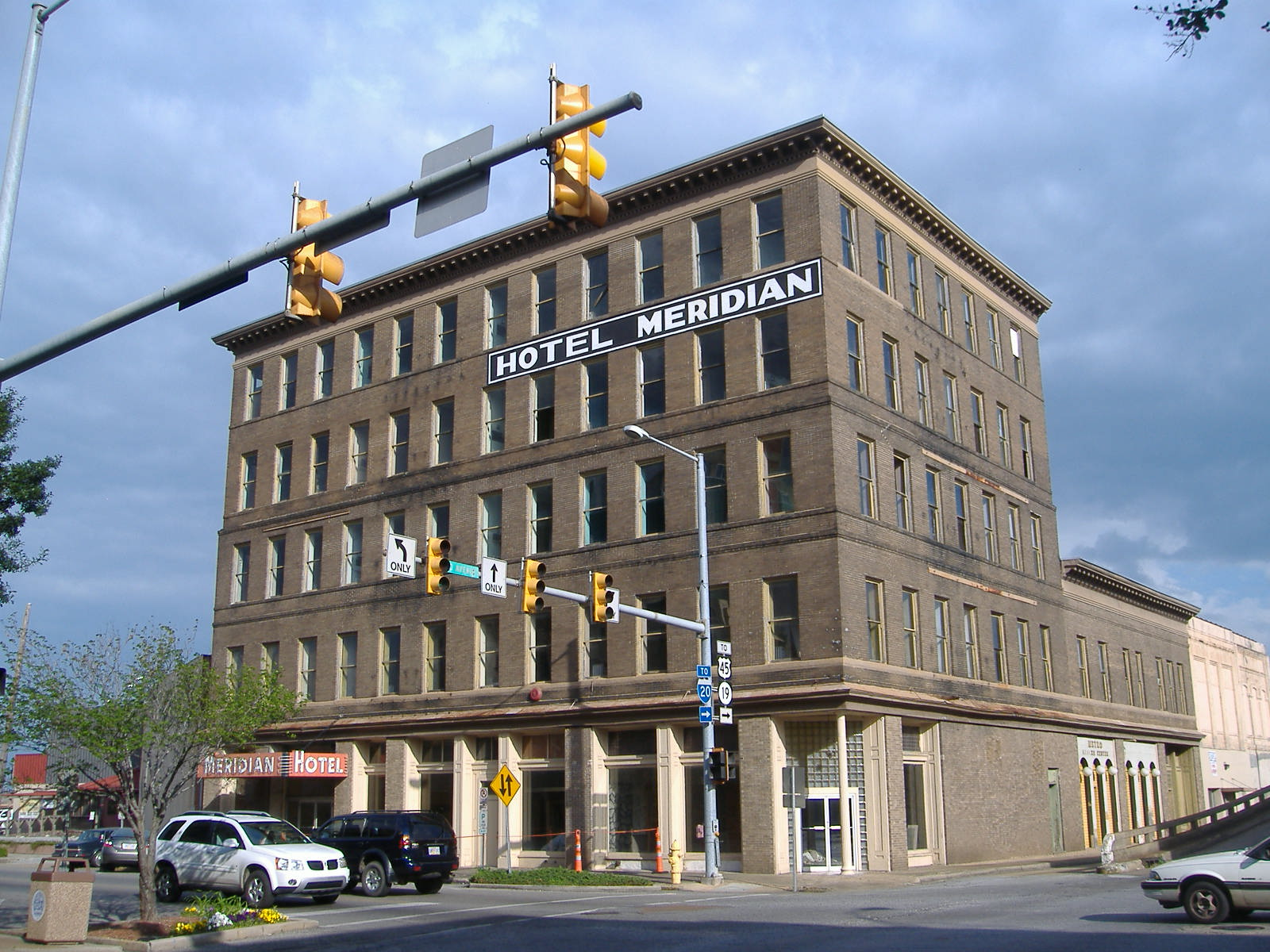
1. Hotel Meridian (2119 Front St)
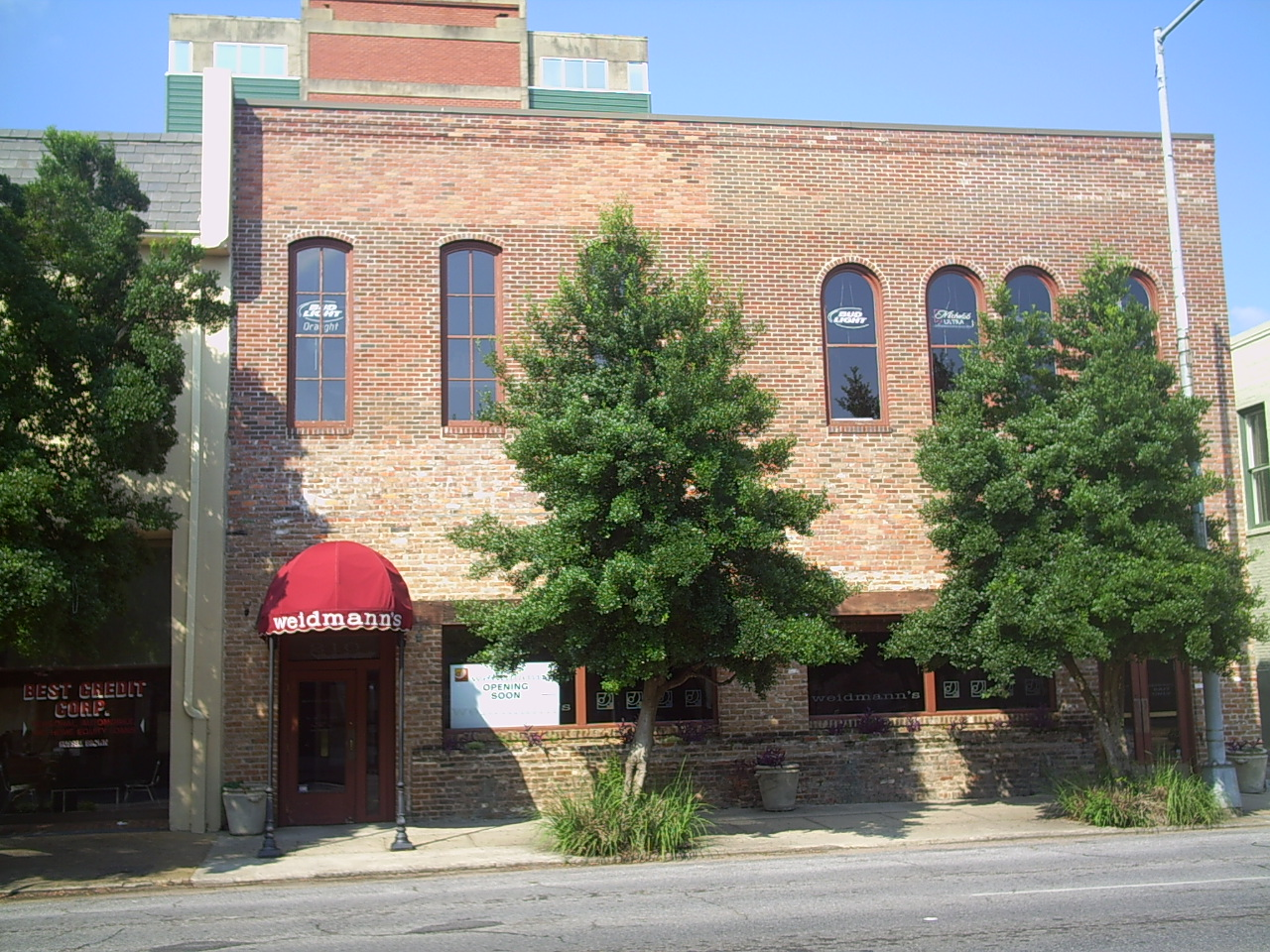
2. Weidmann's Restaurant (108–210 22nd Ave)
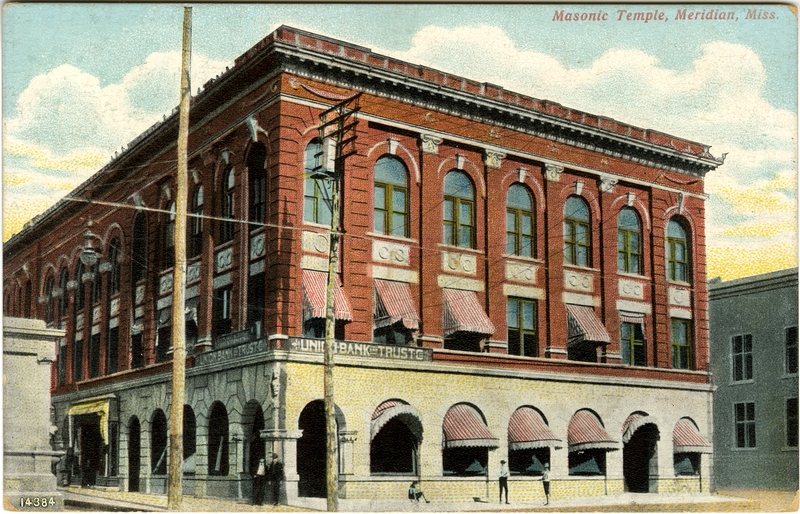
3. Masonic Temple Building (2215–2225 4th St)
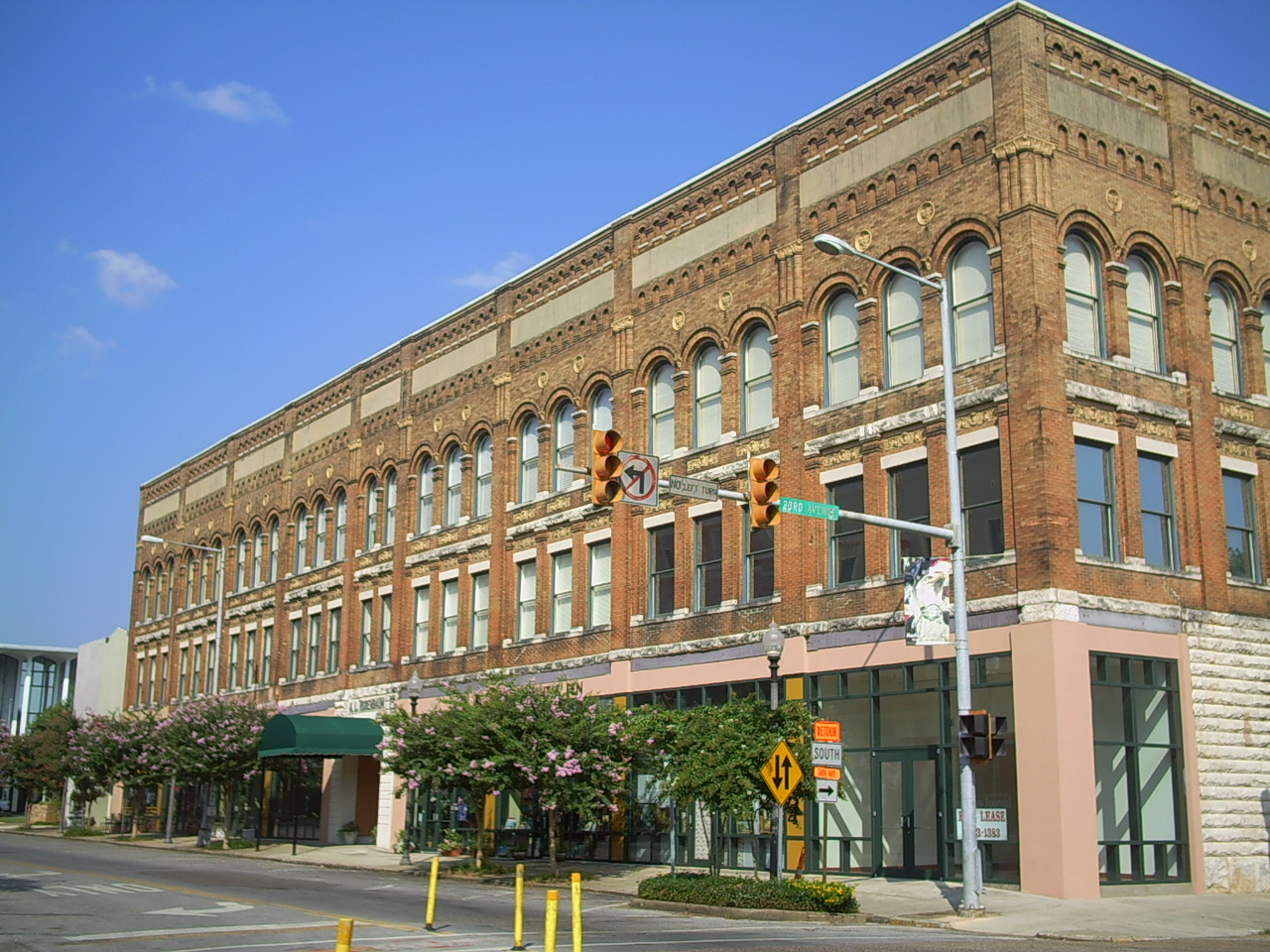
4. Rosenbaum Building (2213–2219 5th St)
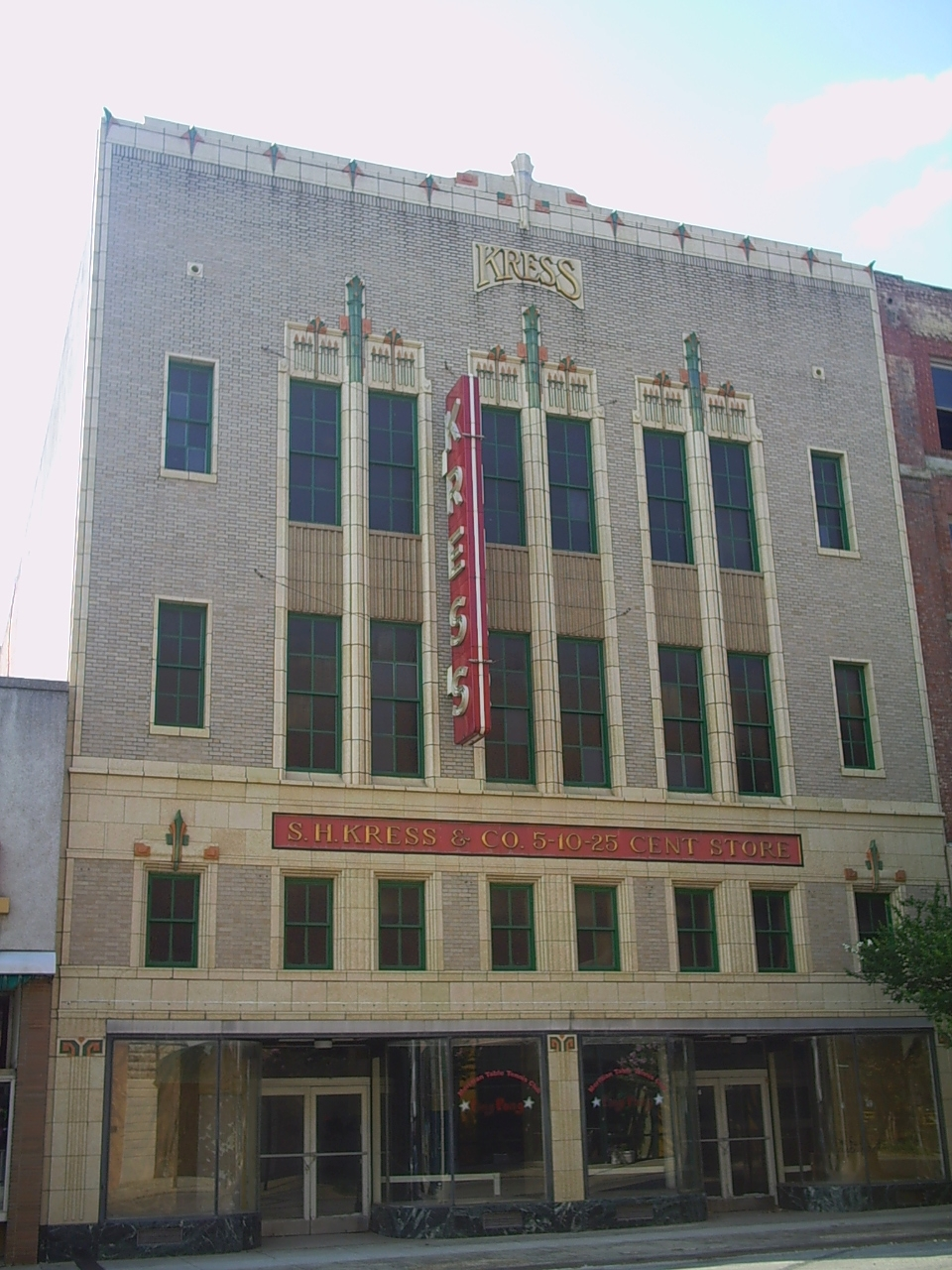
5. Kress Building (2214 5th St)
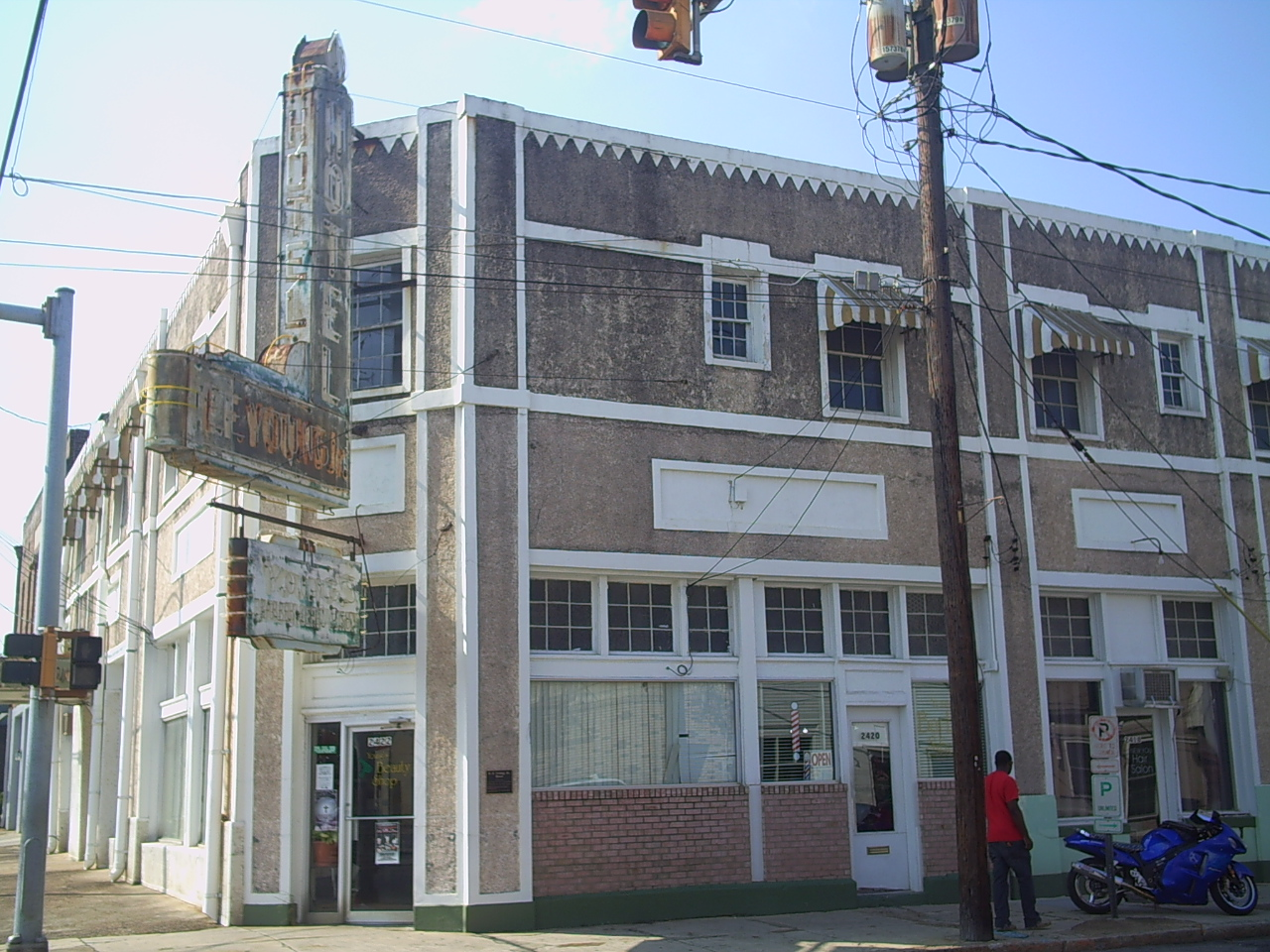
6. E.F. Young Hotel (500 25th Ave)

=== Union Station Historic District ===
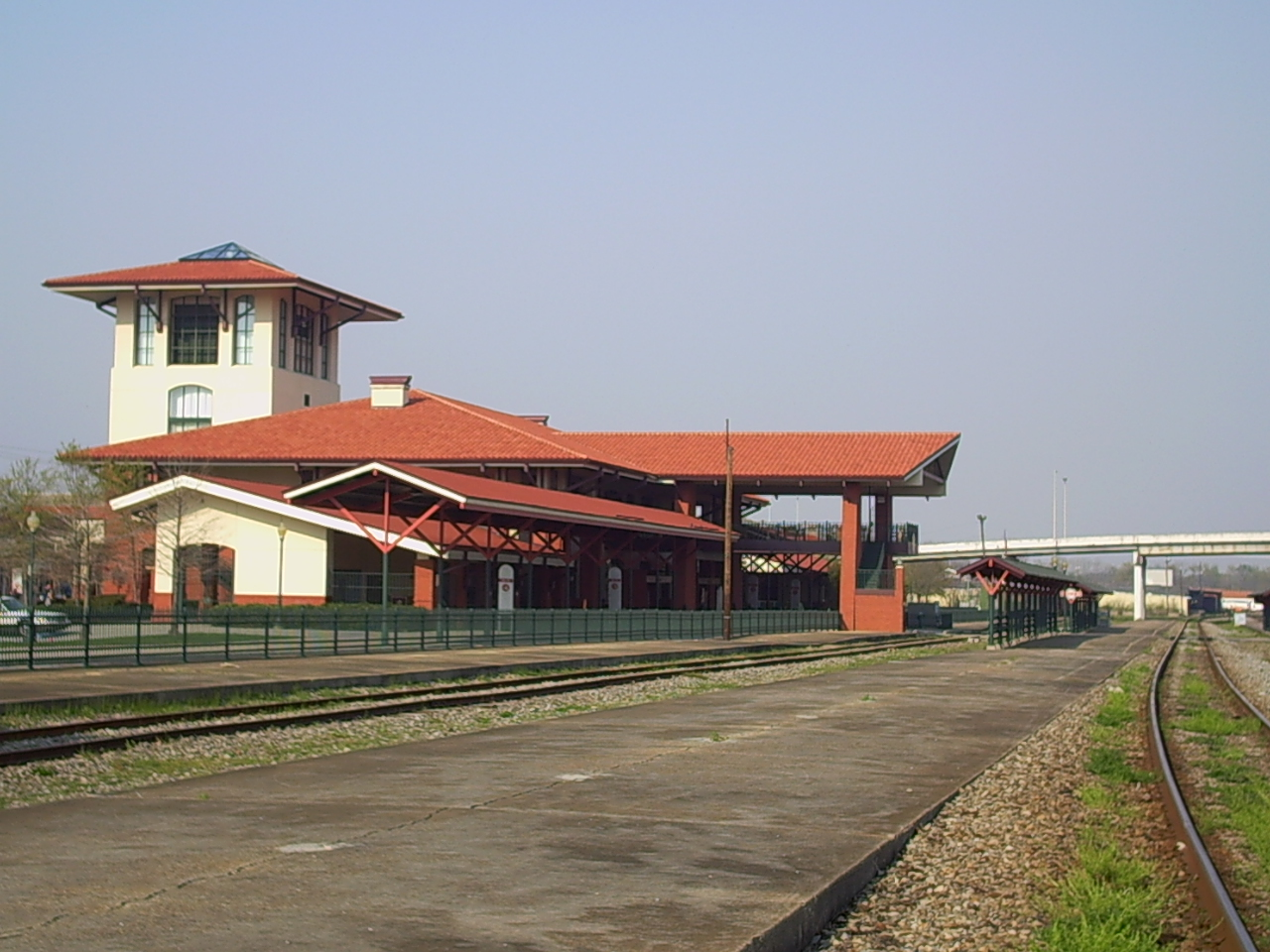
Union Station

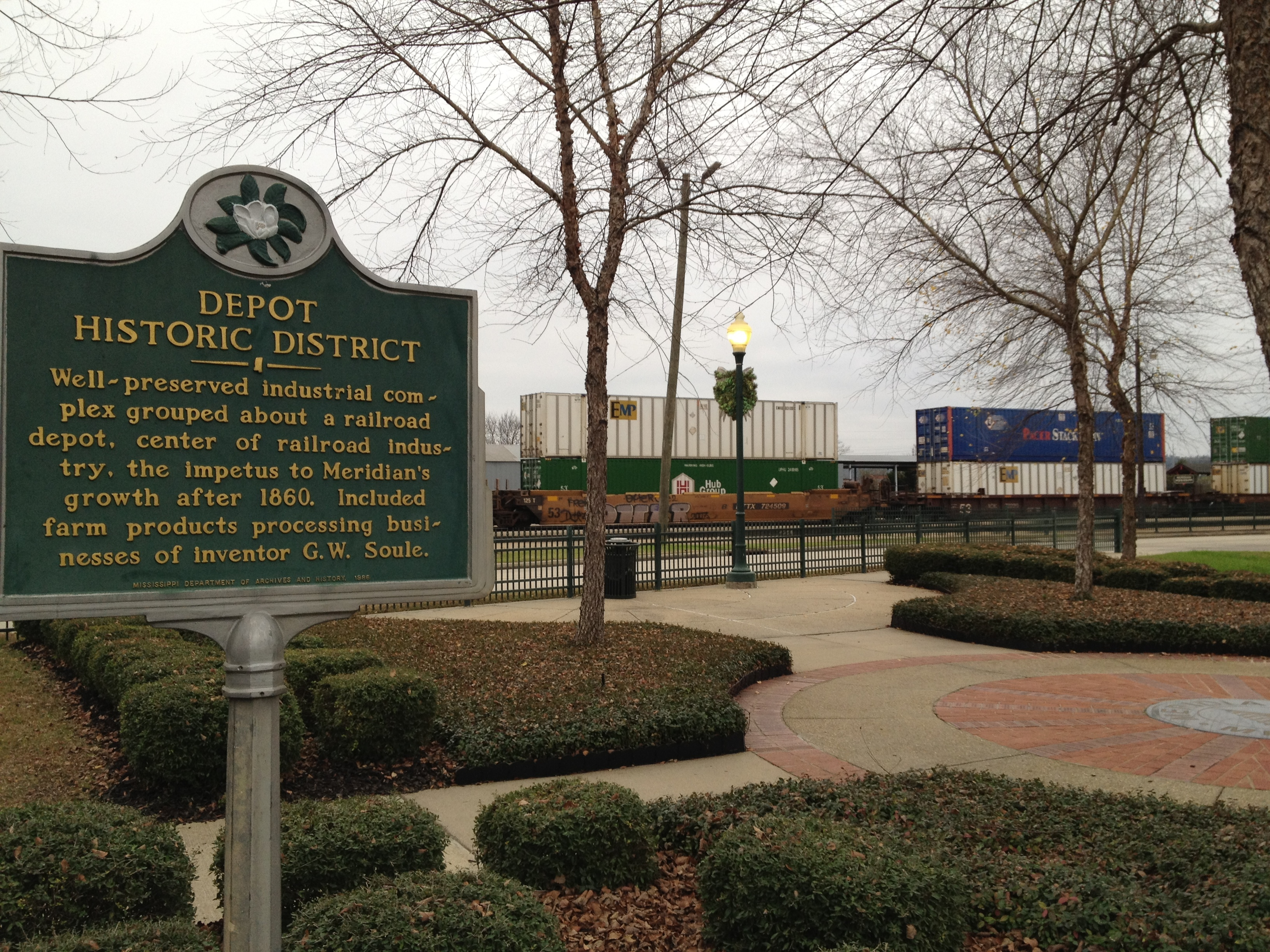
Depot Historic District sign outside of Union Station

The former Union Station Historic District, originally added to the National Register of Historic Places on December 18, 1979, as "Meridian Depot District," occupied the area between 18th and 19th Avenues, stretching from the railroad north to 5th St. Just over a block east of the Meridian Urban Center Historic District, the district covers an area of 80 acres (0.32 km^{2}).

In 1885, Meridian was the junction of five railroads, with three others considering coming into the city. From then to 1905, this area was primarily residential, with a small industrial complex developing around the railroads. The construction of Union Station in 1905–1906 led to the development of this area in business and industry. Much of Union Station was demolished in 1966, but a small portion continued to serve as a passenger station.

The name change occurred in 2000, after the demolished section of Union Station was rebuilt in 1996 as the Union Station Multi-Modal Transportation Facility. Another name change occurred in 2005 when the district was combined with Urban Center Historic District to become Meridian Downtown Historic District.

Notable contributing properties include:

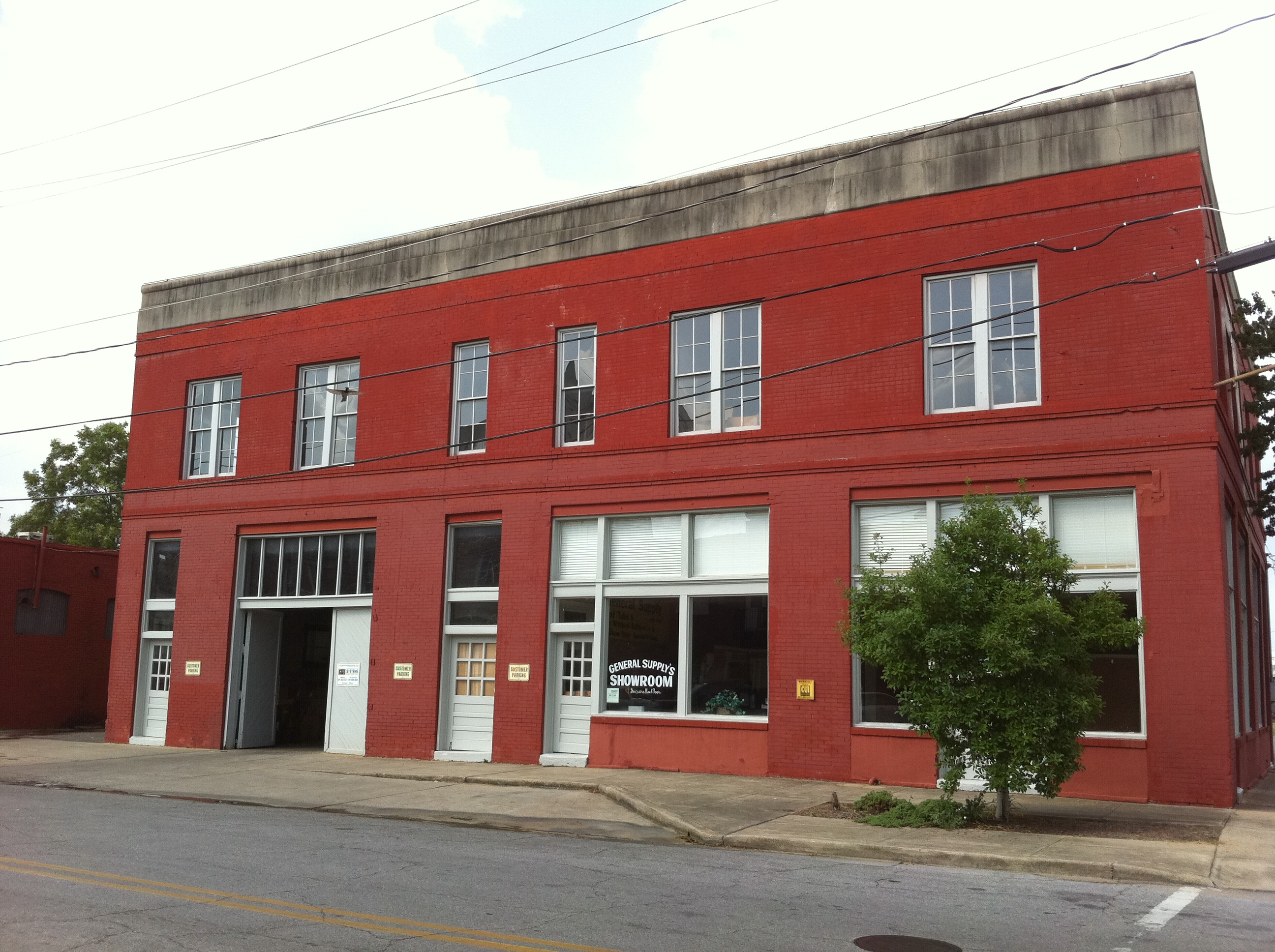
1. Elmira Hotel (1804 Front St)
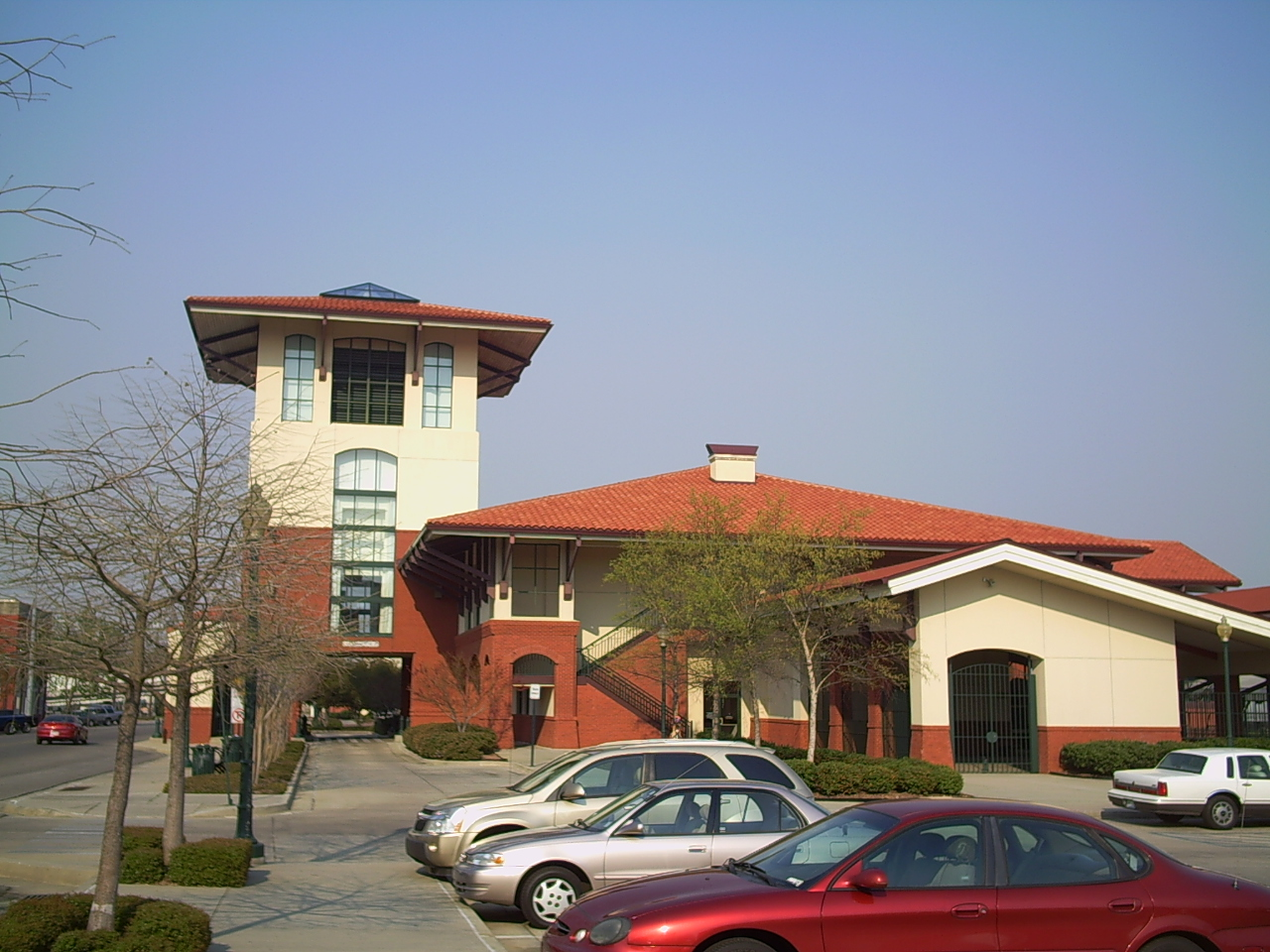
2. Union Station (1805 Front St)
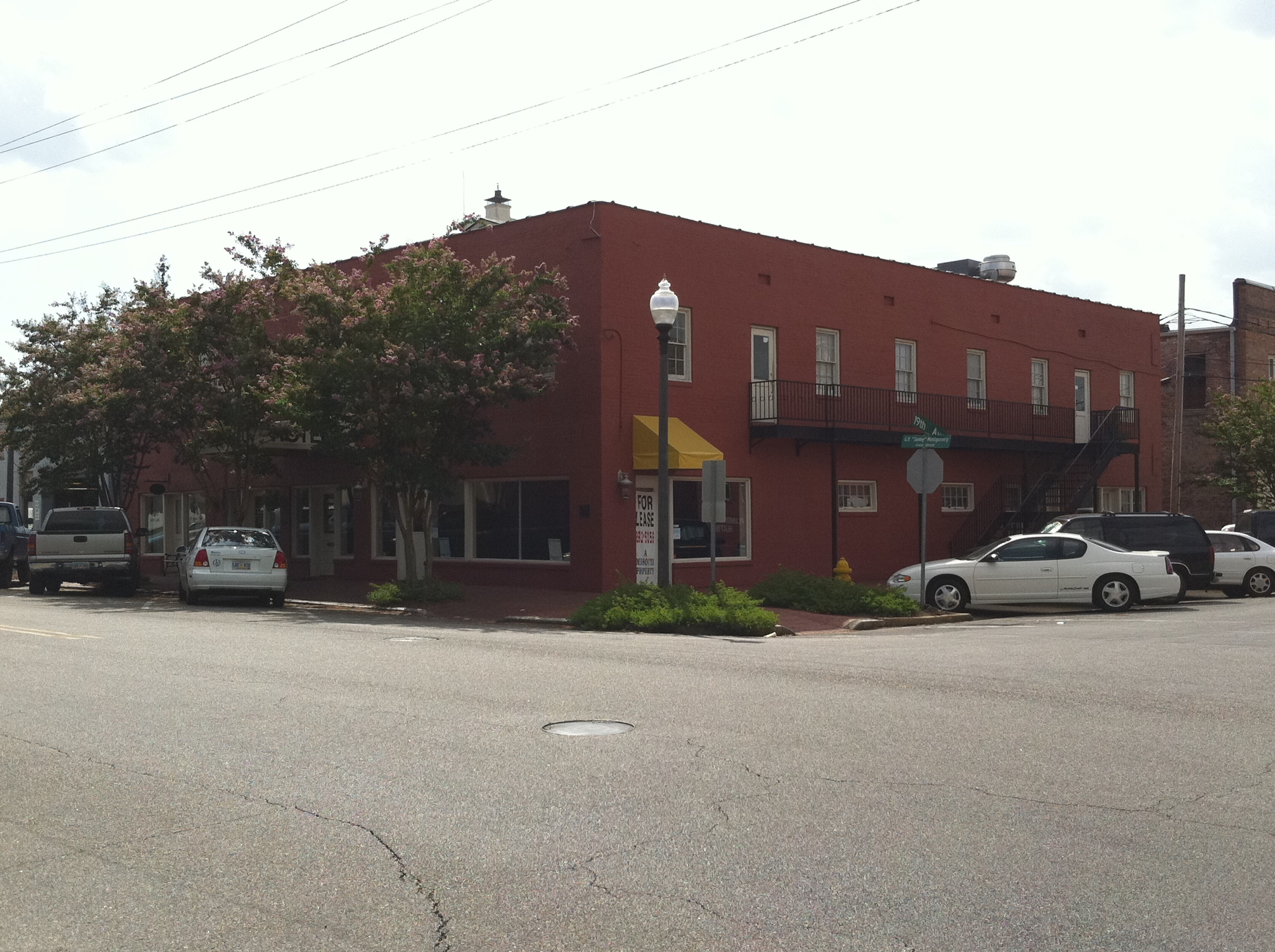
3. Terminal Hotel (1902 Front St)
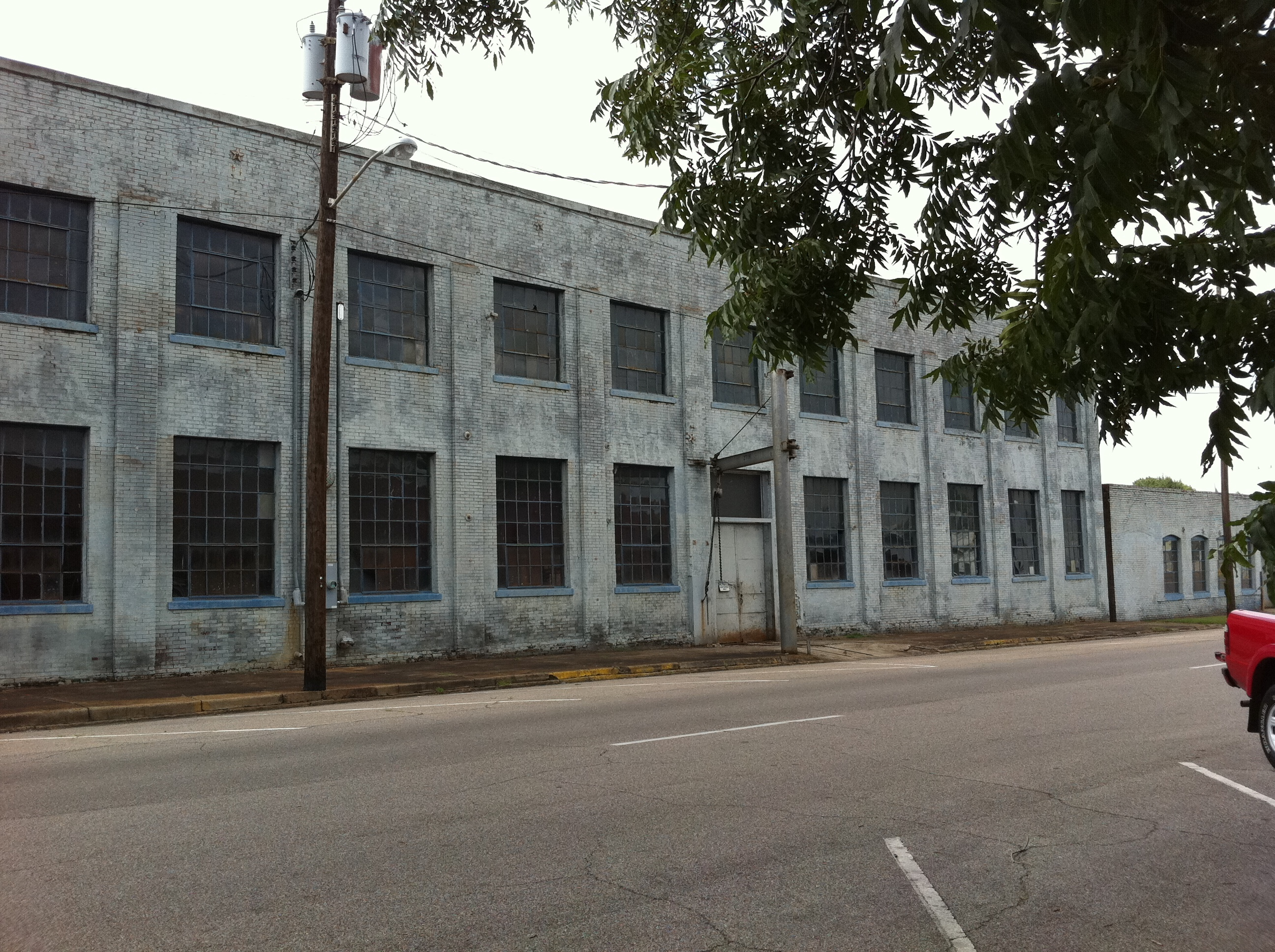
4. Soulé Steam Feed Works (1806–1808 4th St and 1803–1809 5th St)
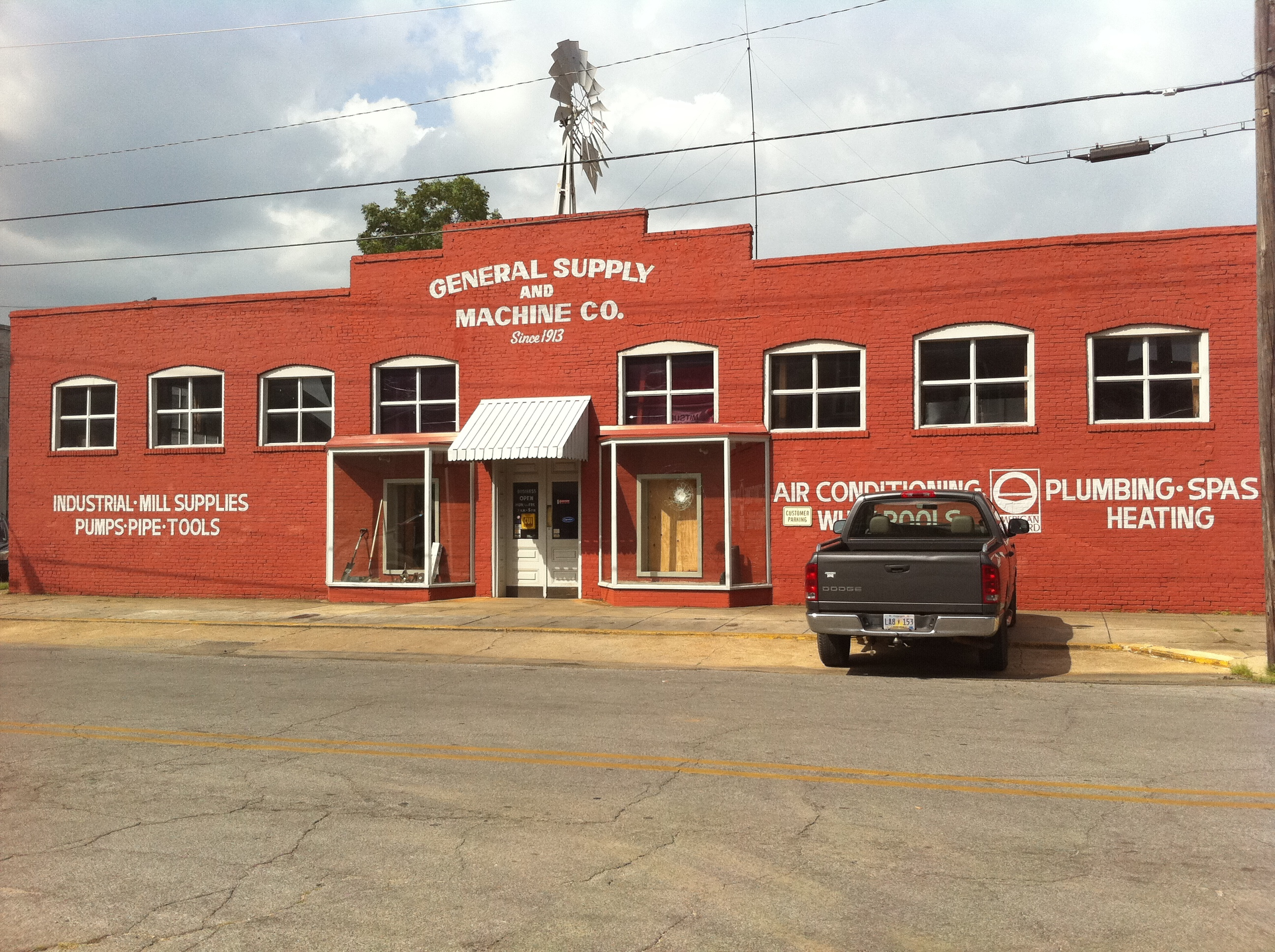
5. Cliff Williams Machine Shop/General Supply Store (208–210 19th Ave)

== Merrehope Historic District ==
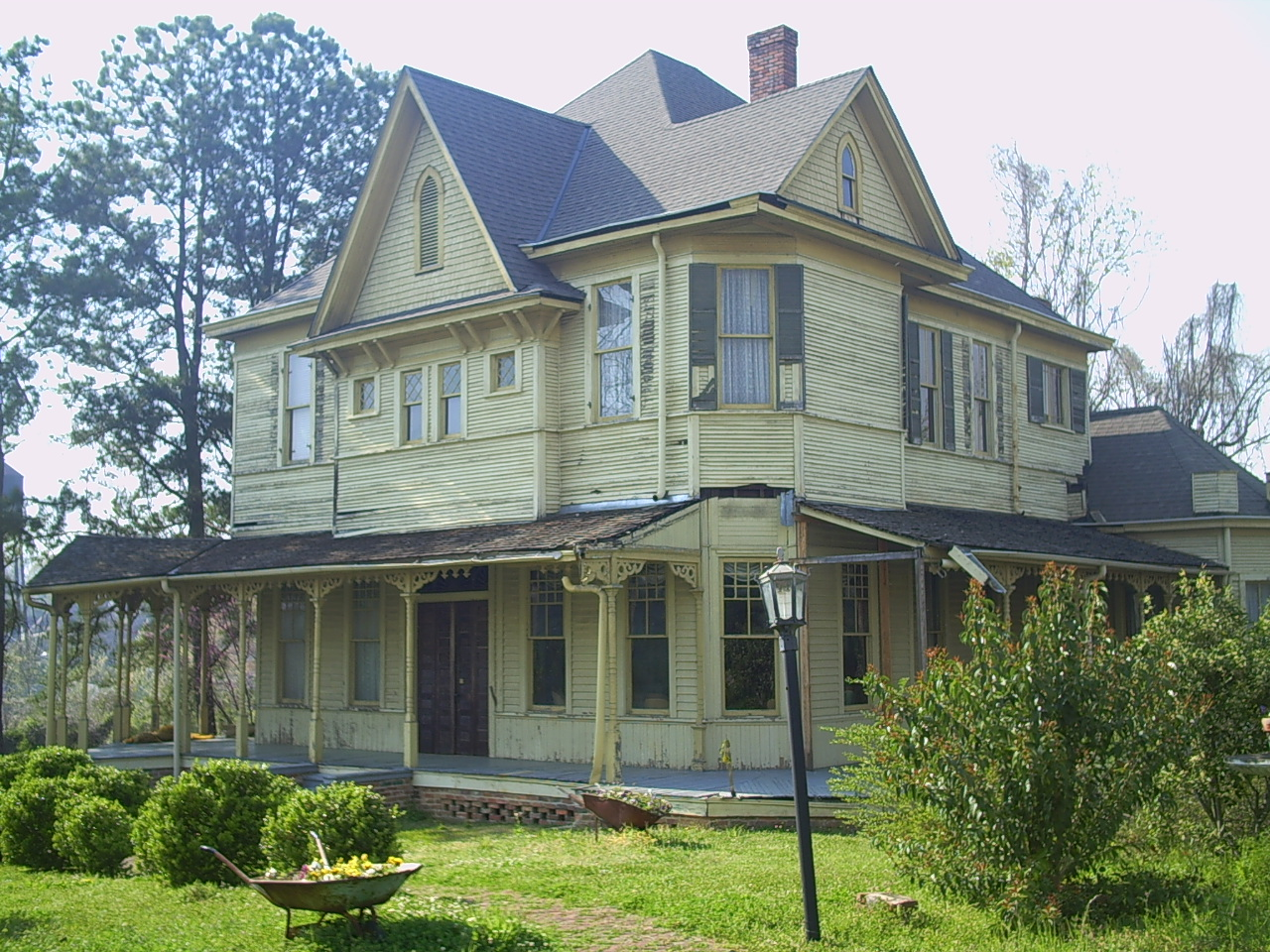
Frank W. Williams Home

Merrehope Historic District is an irregular shape, roughly bounded by 14th St to the north, 26th Ave to the east, 8th St to the south, and 30th Ave to the west. An additional section extends from the western edge between 8th and 10th streets and terminates at 33rd Ave. The 350-acre (1.4 km^{2}) district was listed on the National Register of Historic Places on September 19, 1988. Architecture in the district ranges from the late 1880s to about 1940, representing Meridian's Golden Age and focusing on the African-American community of the time.

The district was originally subdivided around 1853 by city founder John T. Ball, but started developing after the American Civil War. Following the war, Meridian's economy boomed through railroading, logging and textile enterprises. As Meridian began to grow northward, so did the need for housing. This housing development was made possible by the Meridian streetcar system established in 1883, which had a station adjacent to the Merrehope district on 10th Street and lines running along 8th Street and 29th Avenue. Until a few years before then, most of the city's residents lived downtown close to their workplaces. With the streetcar system up and running, workers could now relocate to the outskirts of the city and commute to work. The 1907 Illustrated Handbook of Meridian, Mississippi describes the relocation as "a wonderful spreading out of hundreds of families who had for years remained in cramped quarters in the congested section of the city."

Much of the district, especially the northern part, was inhabited by middle-class blacks during its peak. In 1908 blacks owned more than fifty businesses in the city, and many were lawyers, doctors, teachers and nurses. Many of these lived in Merrehope District. The district's strong ties to the black community are exemplified in its institutions. A black fire company was located at 9th St and 27th Ave from 1884 to 1903, and two black churches, First Baptist Church and St. Paul United Methodist Church, were built in the district in the late 19th century. The Carnegie library built for African Americans in the city was the only Carnegie library for blacks in the entire country. The Masonic Temple, built in 1903, was owned jointly by three black fraternal lodges and stood as a tribute to the business capacity and enterprise of the black community.

The district is home to five buildings listed on the National Register separately:

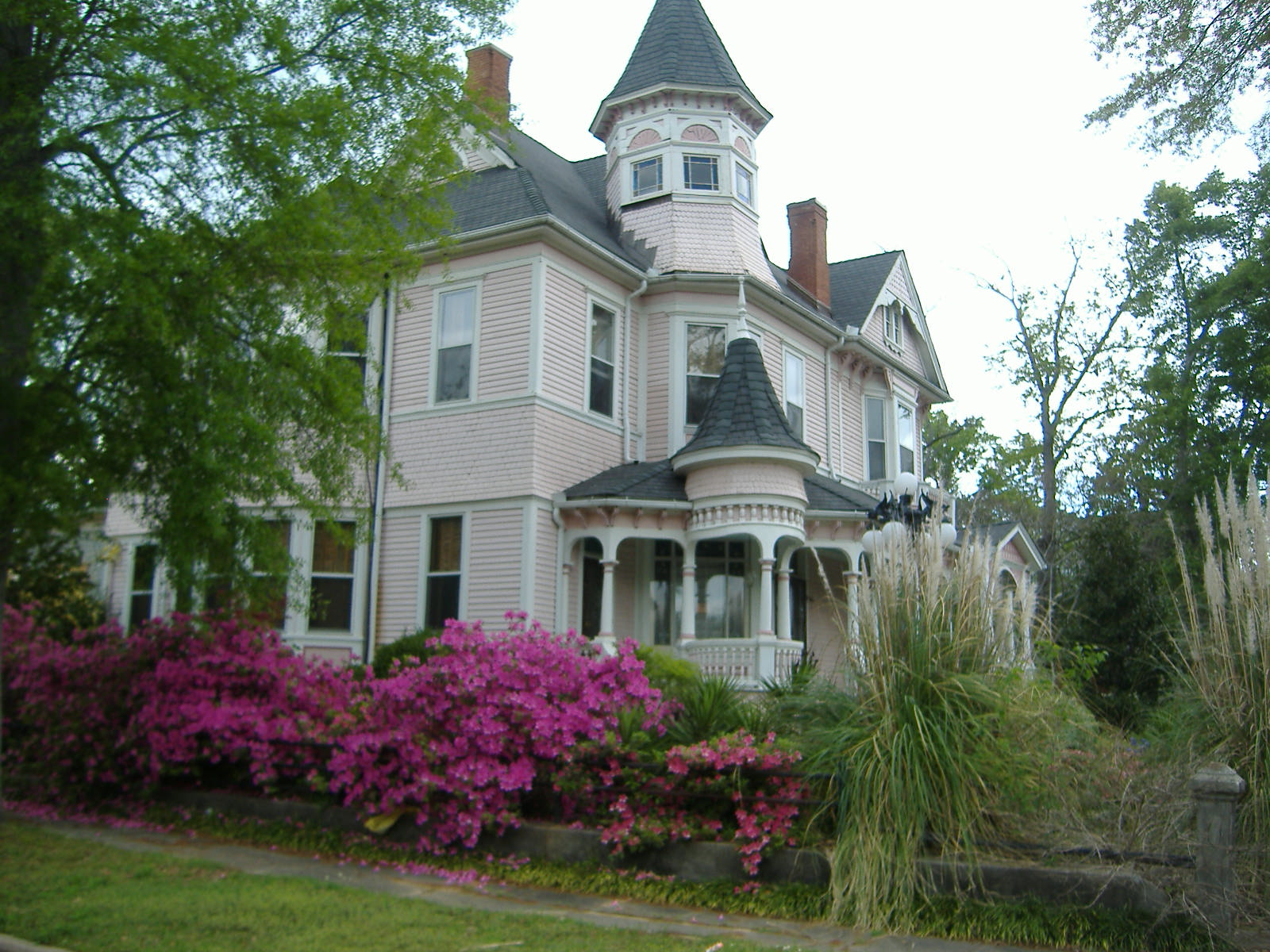
1. Elson-Dudley House (1101 29th Ave)
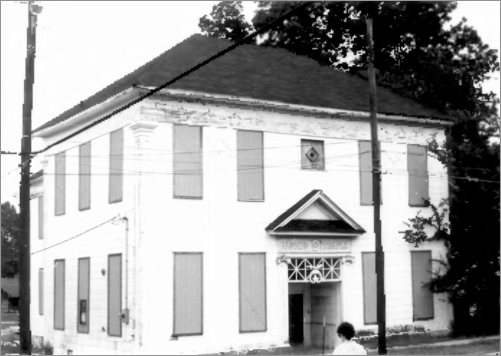
2. Masonic Temple (1220 26th Ave)
3. Dial House (1003 30th Ave)
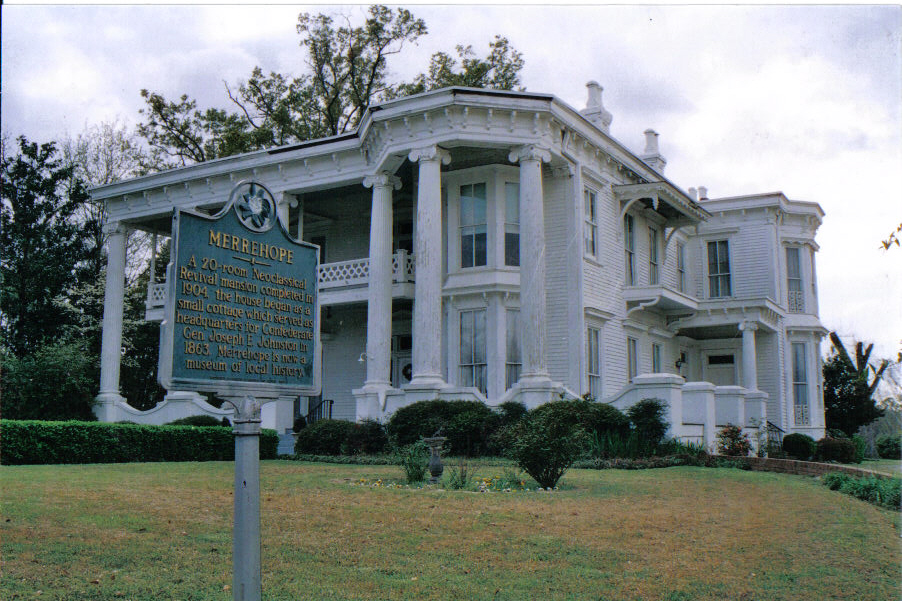
4. Merrehope Historical Home (905 31st Ave)
5. Carnegie Branch Library (2721 13th St)

Structures still standing that are identified as pivotal to the nature of the district include:

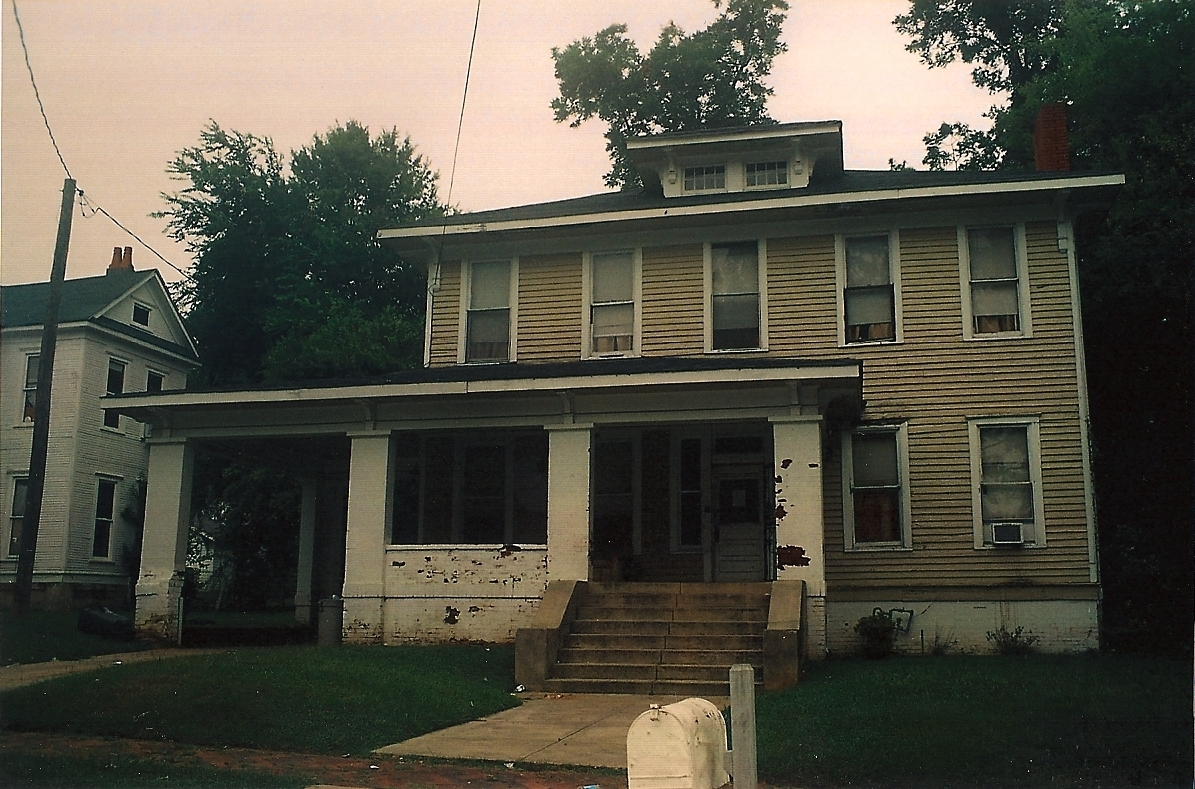
1. 3010 9th St – Two-story Mediterranean style wooden residence with pyramidal roof. The house was built in 1915 by M. R. Grant, who helped establish the Marion Park neighborhood.
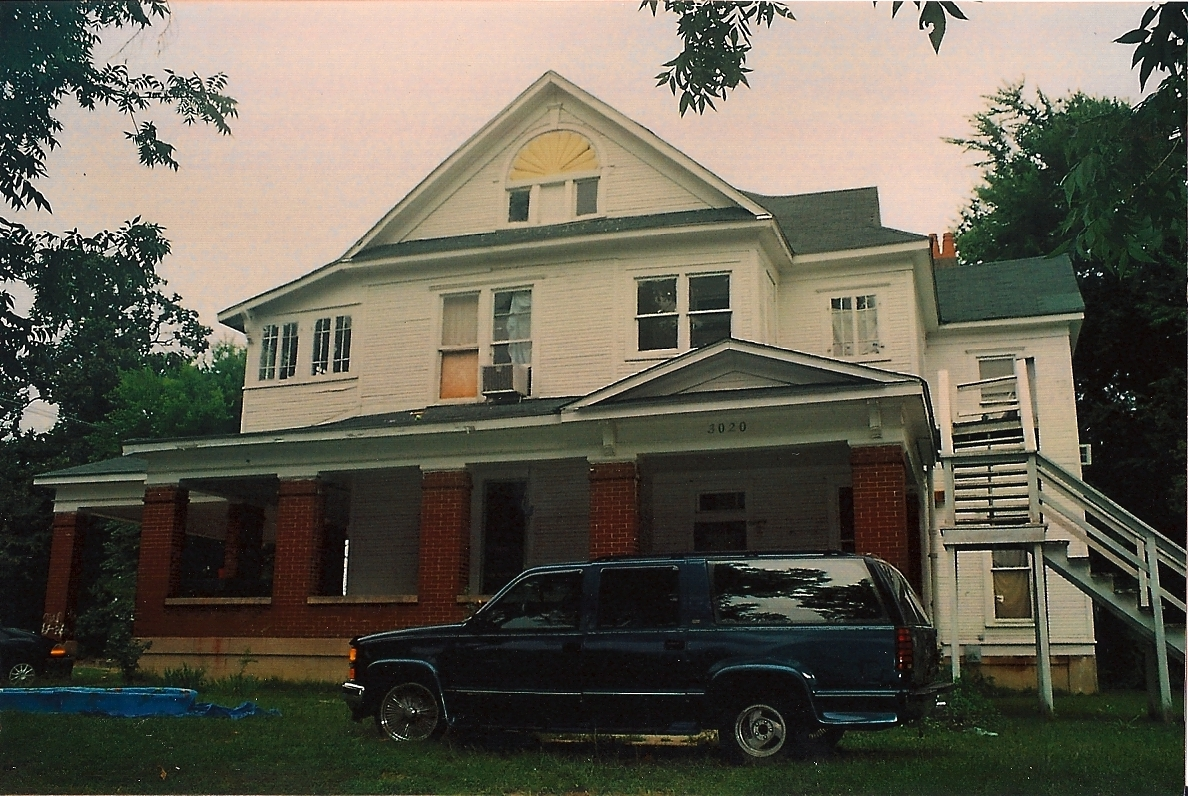
2. 3020 9th St – Two-story Queen Anne–style residence.
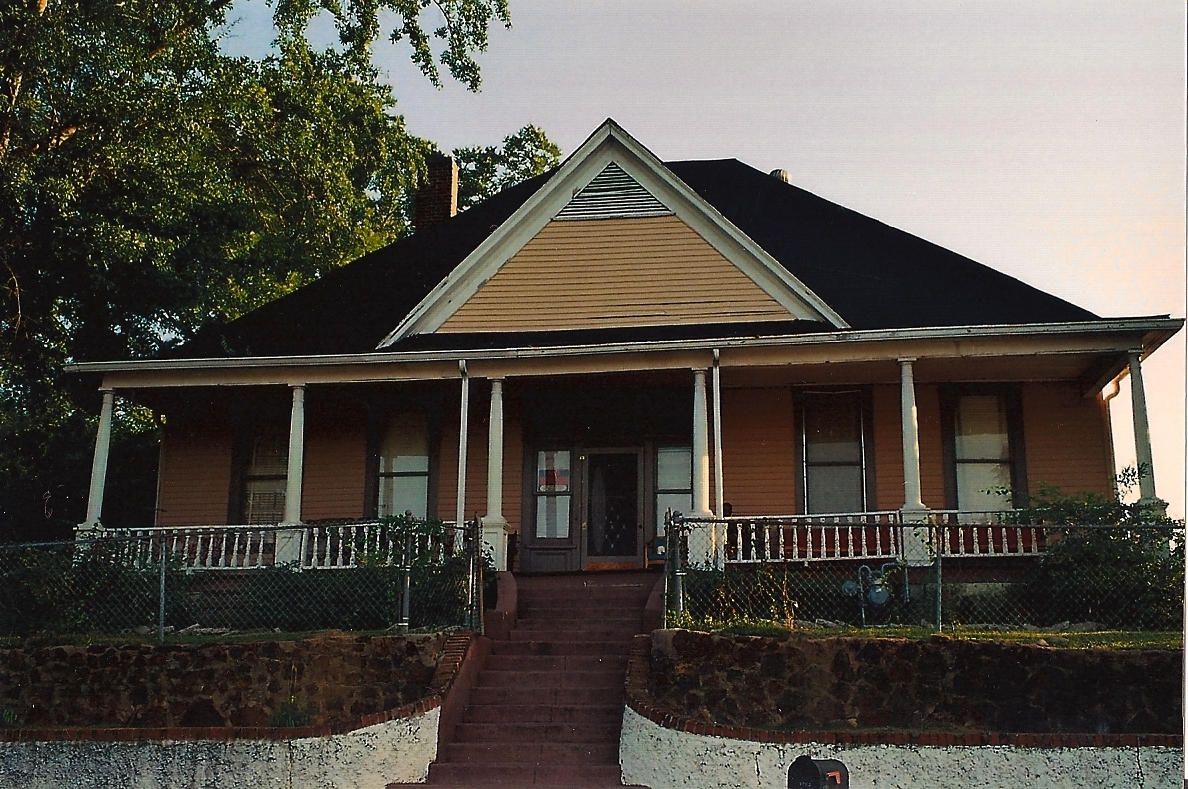
3. 2702 10th St – One-story Queen Anne–style cottage.
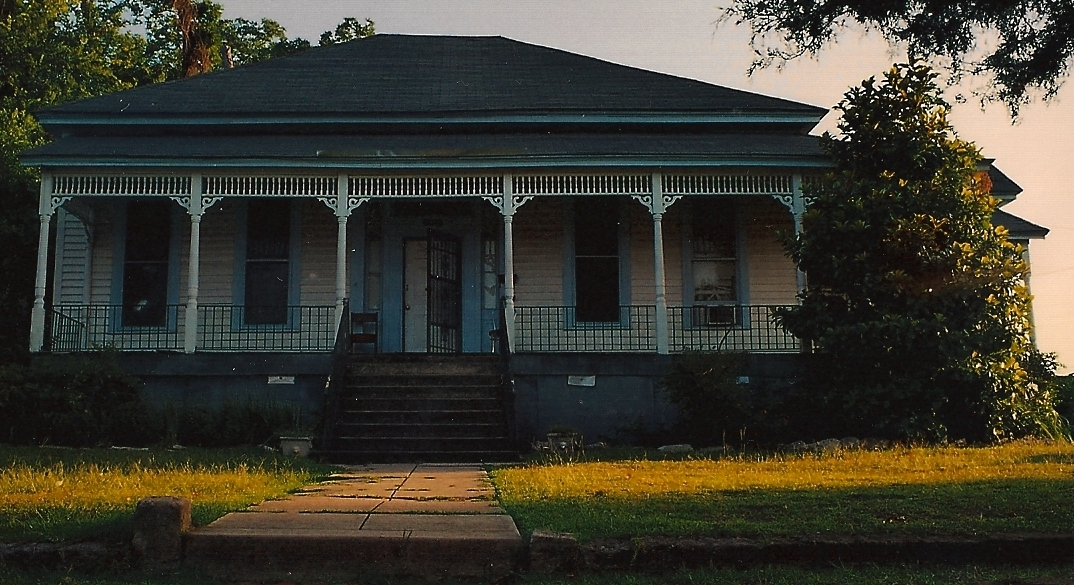
4. 2702 11th St – One-story Queen Anne–style residence.
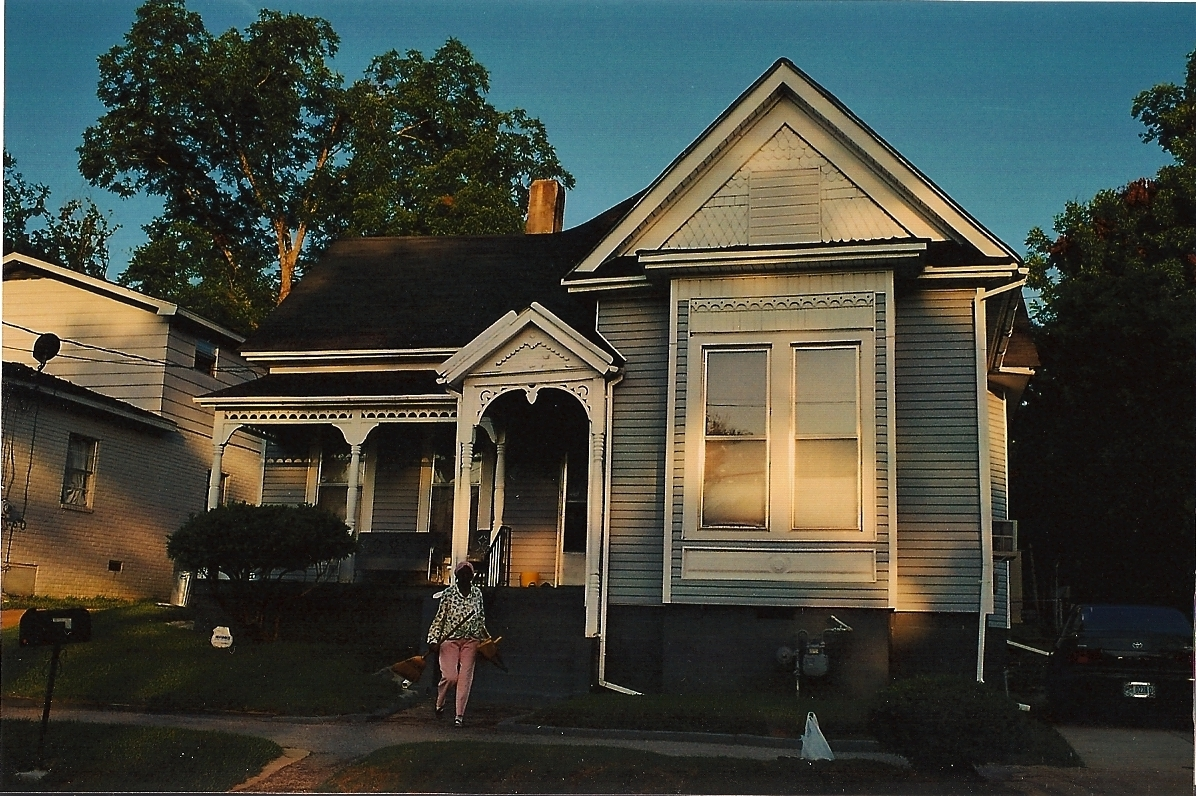
5. 1215 26th Ave – Queen Anne–style cottage built during the 1890s.
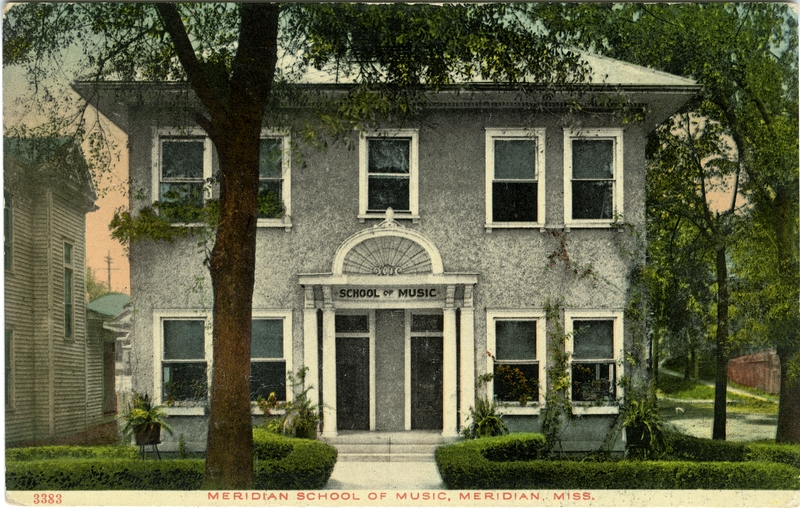
6. Meridian School of Music (815 28th Ave) – Two-story Mediterranean-style building built in 1909. The school was the first chartered music school in the state.
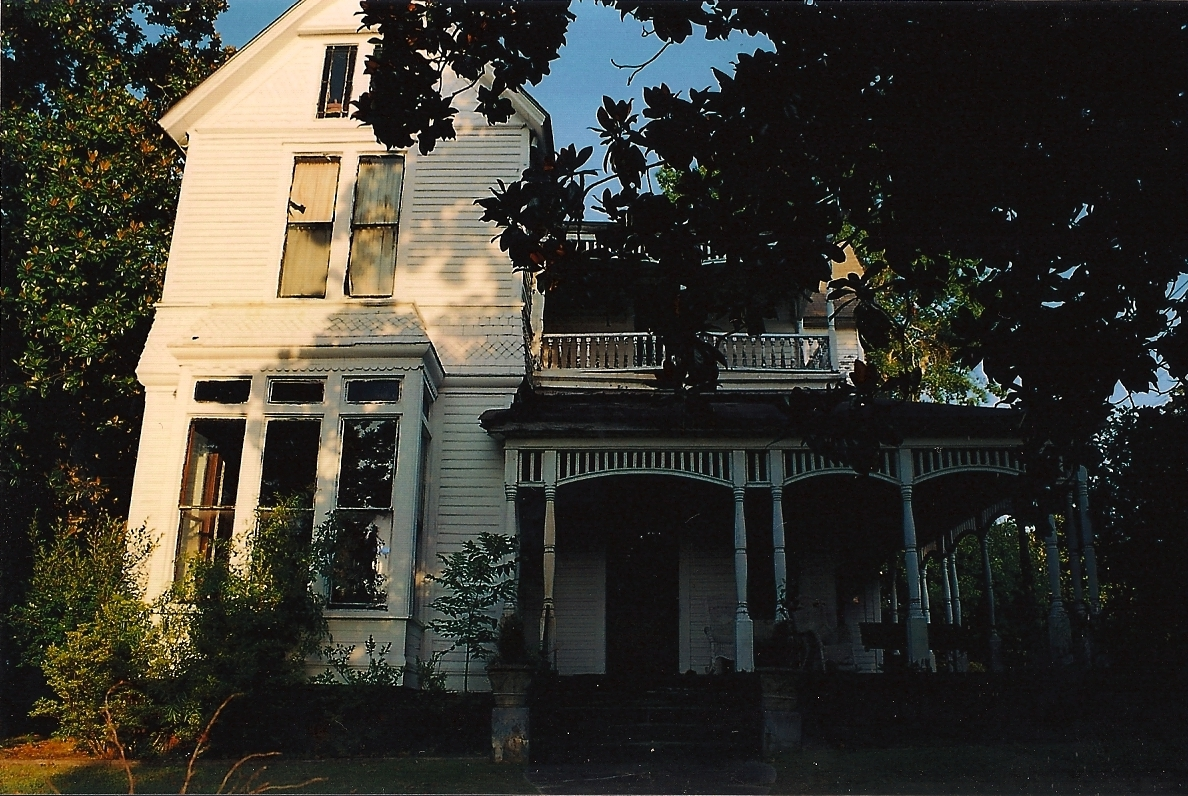
7. 1121 29th Ave – Two-story Queen Anne–style cottage built during the 1880s.
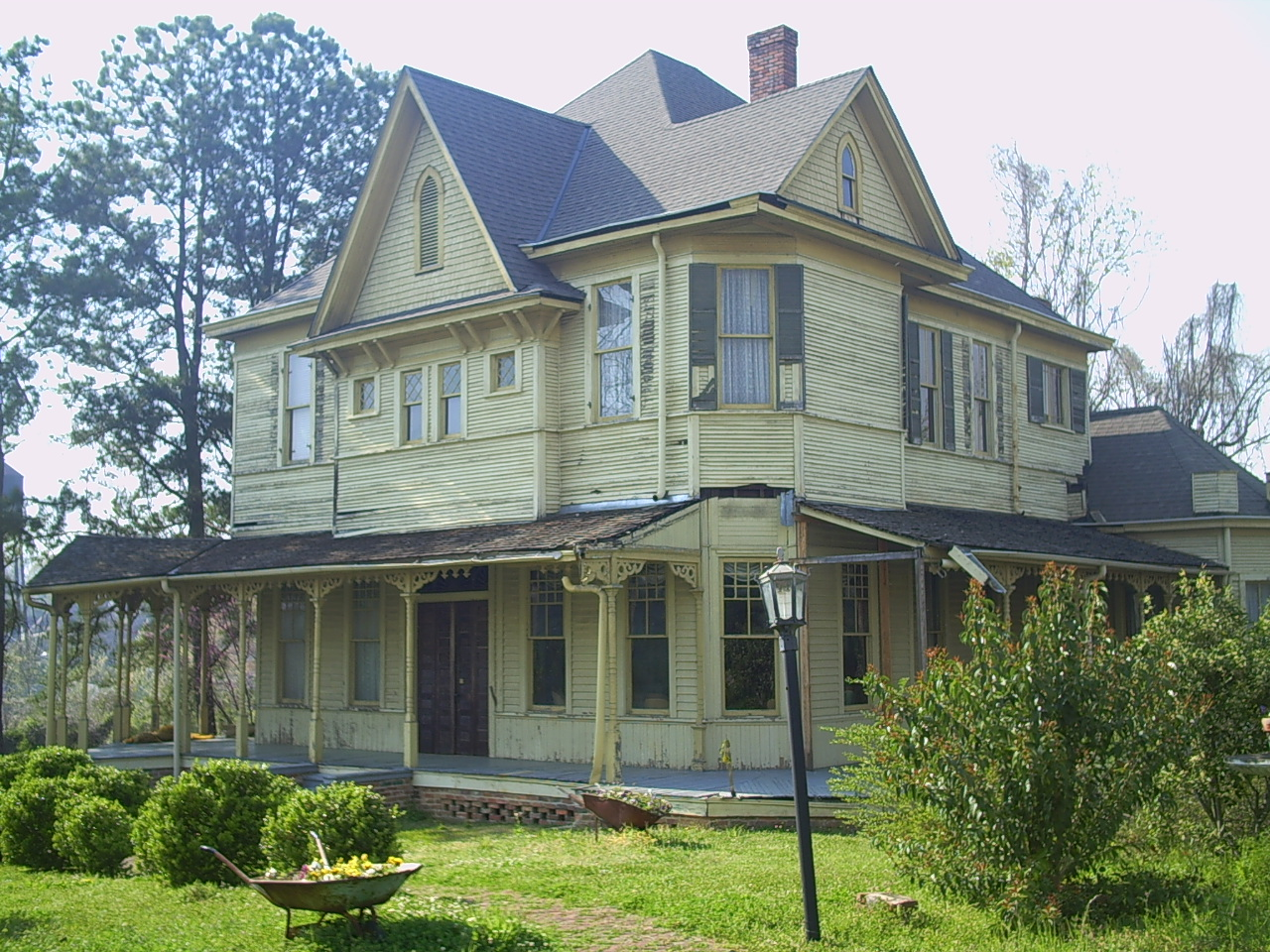
8. Frank W. Williams Home (905 31st Ave) – located on the same lot as Merrehope. Built in 1886, the home is an example of Queen Anne style architecture with stained glass, oak paneling, parquet floors, and detailed gingerbread. Many original features and antique furnishings are still in the home. The house was designated a Mississippi Landmark on June 14, 1995.

== Mid-Town Historic District ==
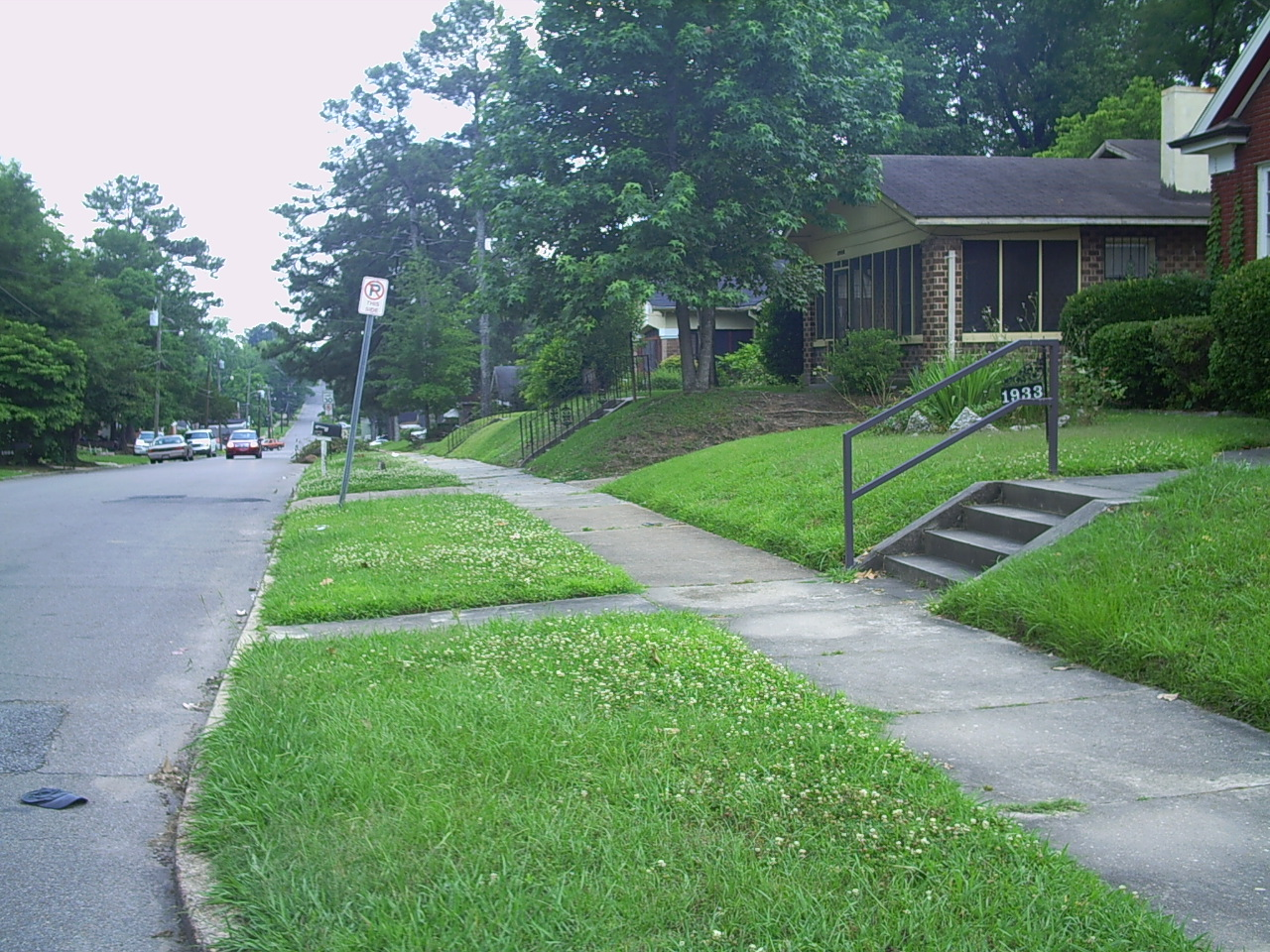
26th Street facing South

Mid-Town Historic District is roughly bounded by 22nd St on the north, 23rd Ave on the east, 15th St on the south, and 28th Ave on the west. It contains a collection of architectural and historically important 20th Century residences representing the houses of Meridian's wealthy industrialists, professionals, and merchants, as well as the working class associated with Meridian's Golden Age, when the city was the center of Mississippi's railroad economy. Because of this historic architecture, the 1,020-acre (4.1 km^{2}) district was added to the National Register of Historic Places on August 21, 1987.

Ninety percent of the buildings in the district were built between 1900 and 1930, most of them in the Bungalow style. The district has a large percentage of brick structures, built as an alternative to the wooden frame residences made popular by the lumber industry and mills in Meridian. 23rd and 24th Aves were main routes connecting downtown with the northern part of the city through Poplar Springs Drive, making these avenues attractive to builders.

Structures listed as pivotal to the nature of the district include:

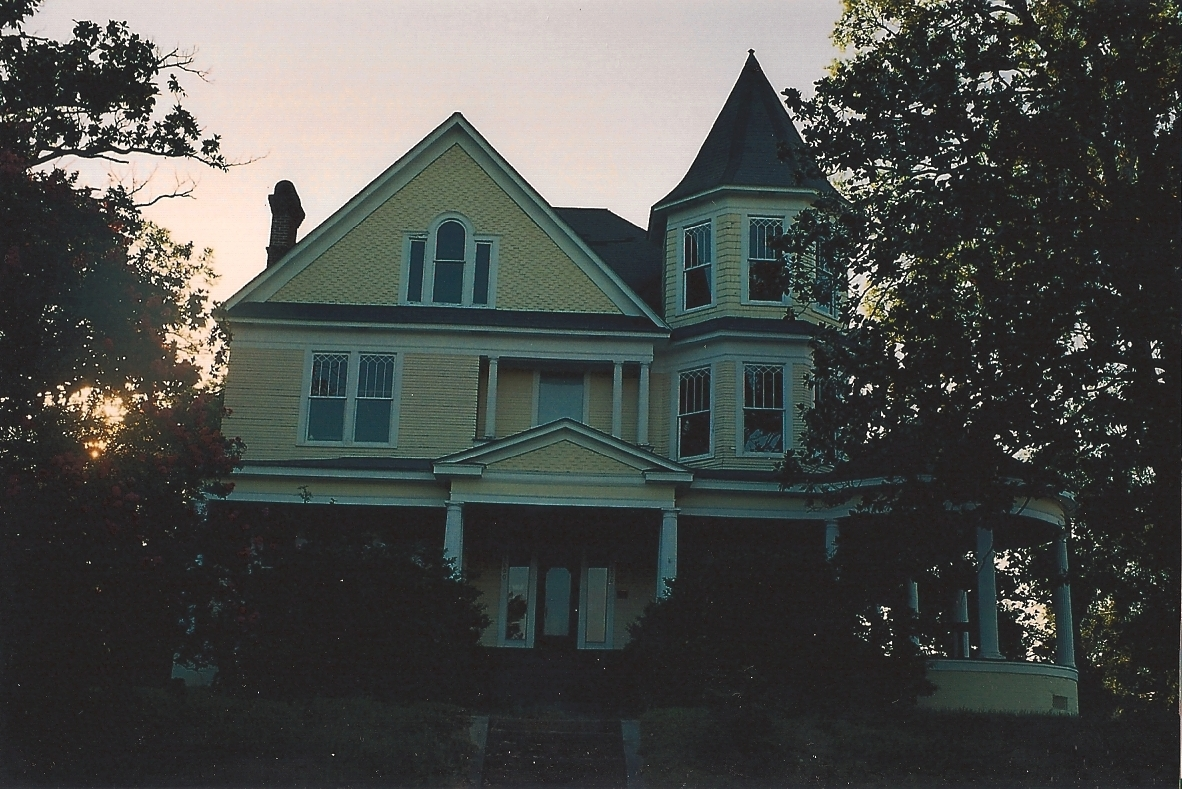
1. 1600 24th Ave – 2 1/2-story Colonial Revival residence.

== Poplar Springs Road Historic District ==
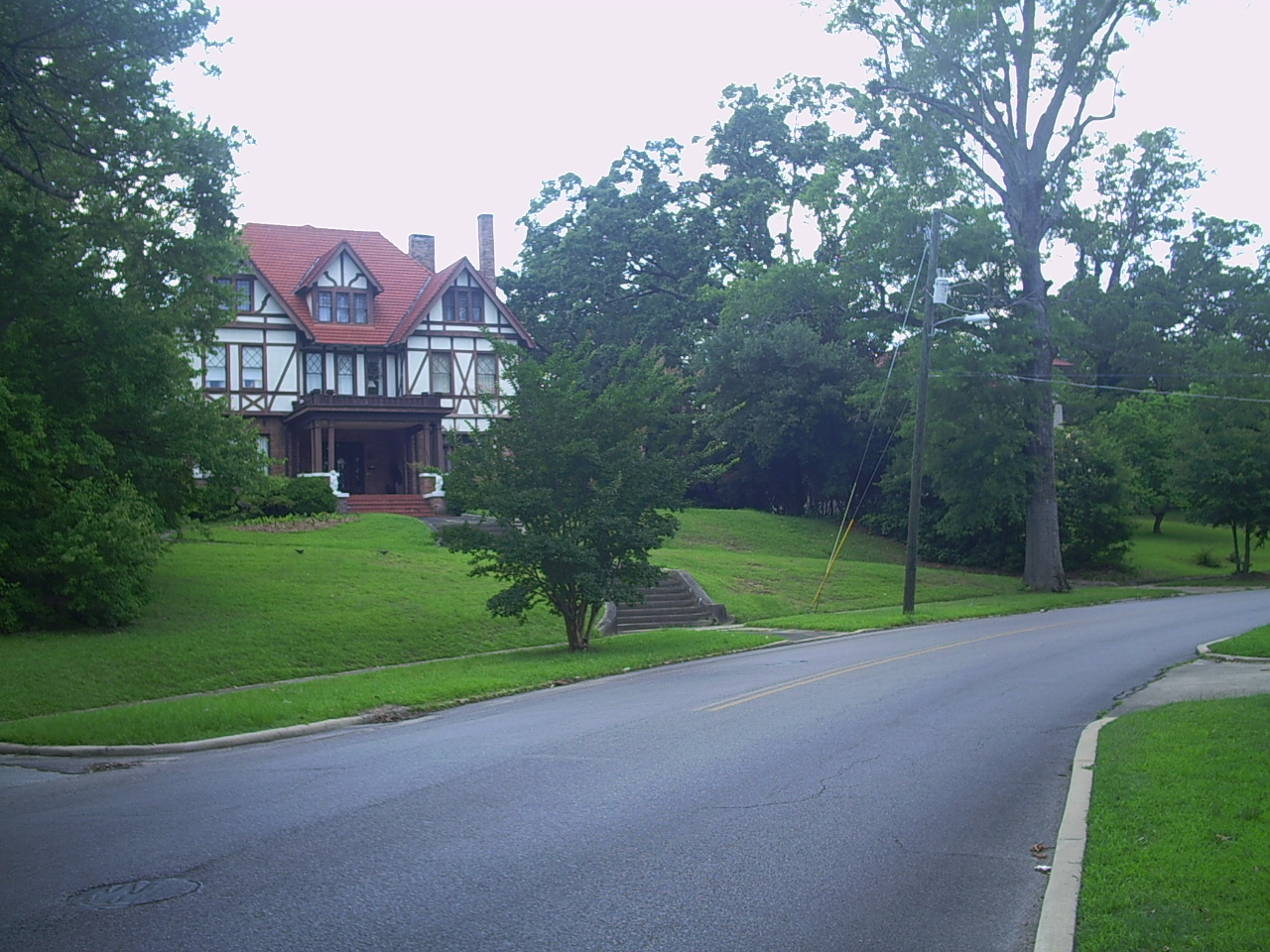
Looking down the street toward 2405 Poplar Springs Road

Poplar Springs Road Historic District is roughly bounded by 29th St on the north, 23rd Ave on the east, 22nd St on the south, and 29th Ave on the east. The 820-acre (3.3 km^{2}) district, added to the National Register of Historic Places on August 21, 1987, is a collection of residences representing the prosperity of Meridian at the turn of the 20th century and pre-Depression era.

Before Poplar Springs Road (now Poplar Springs Drive) was a street, it was a cattle trail. Around the turn of the 20th century there was a spring north of Meridian, and cattle would travel on the path that is now Poplar Springs Drive to get to the spring. This is the reason that the street doesn't follow the same layout pattern as the rest of the city; the cattle's path gives the street its curvy shape.

In 1905, local lumberman M. R. Grant laid out a plan of irregular side streets and lots along Poplar Springs Road and named it Marion Park, after his daughter. One of the city's first hospitals, Matty Hersee, was located in the park, having been built in 1903. The hospital was moved from the district in 1923, and the original building has since been demolished. Marion Park School was built in 1923 and was later expanded to become the current Meridian High School, the primary school in the Meridian Public School District.

Because of this new residential area, many people started moving north and building the structures that still contribute to the district today. As the area developed, a streetcar brought passengers from downtown Meridian to the Poplar Springs area. The old streetcar stop is marked by a banner. Hundreds of shade trees were planted and still contribute to the streetscape of the district.

Structures listed as pivotal to the nature of the district include:

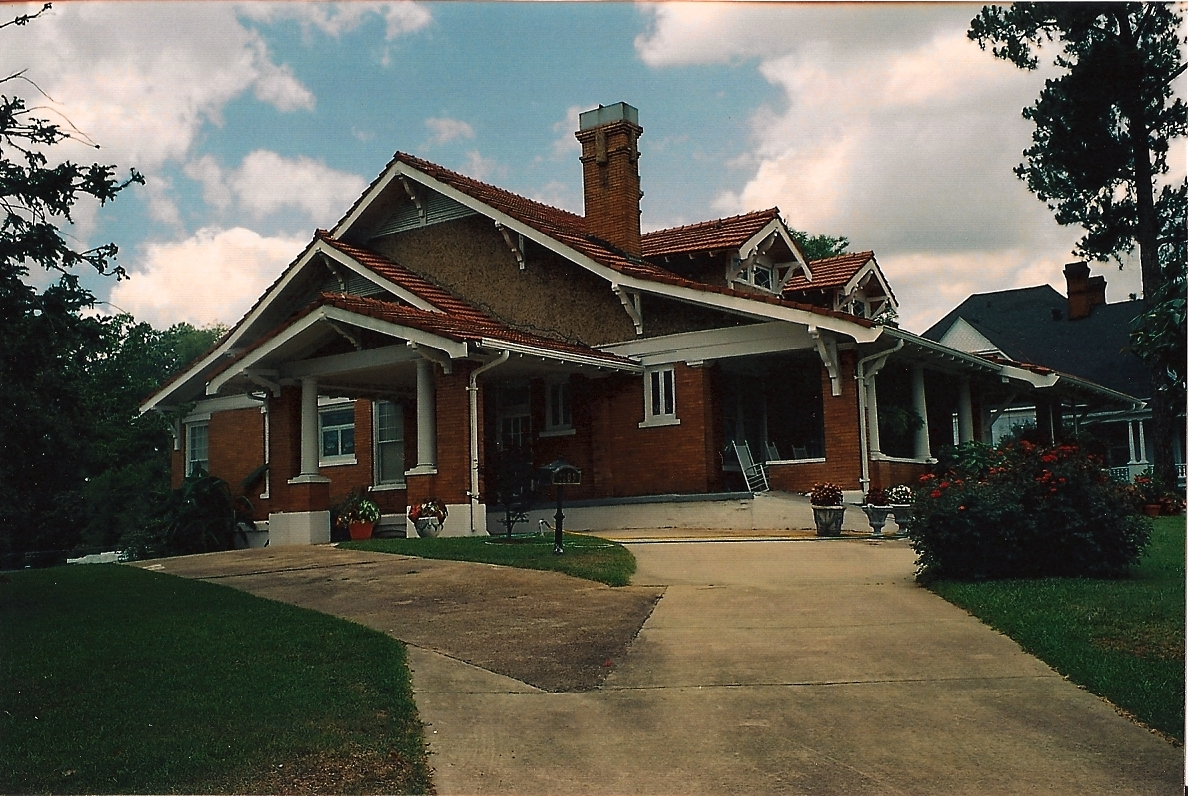
1. 2209 Poplar Springs Rd – One-story Craftsman Bungalow.
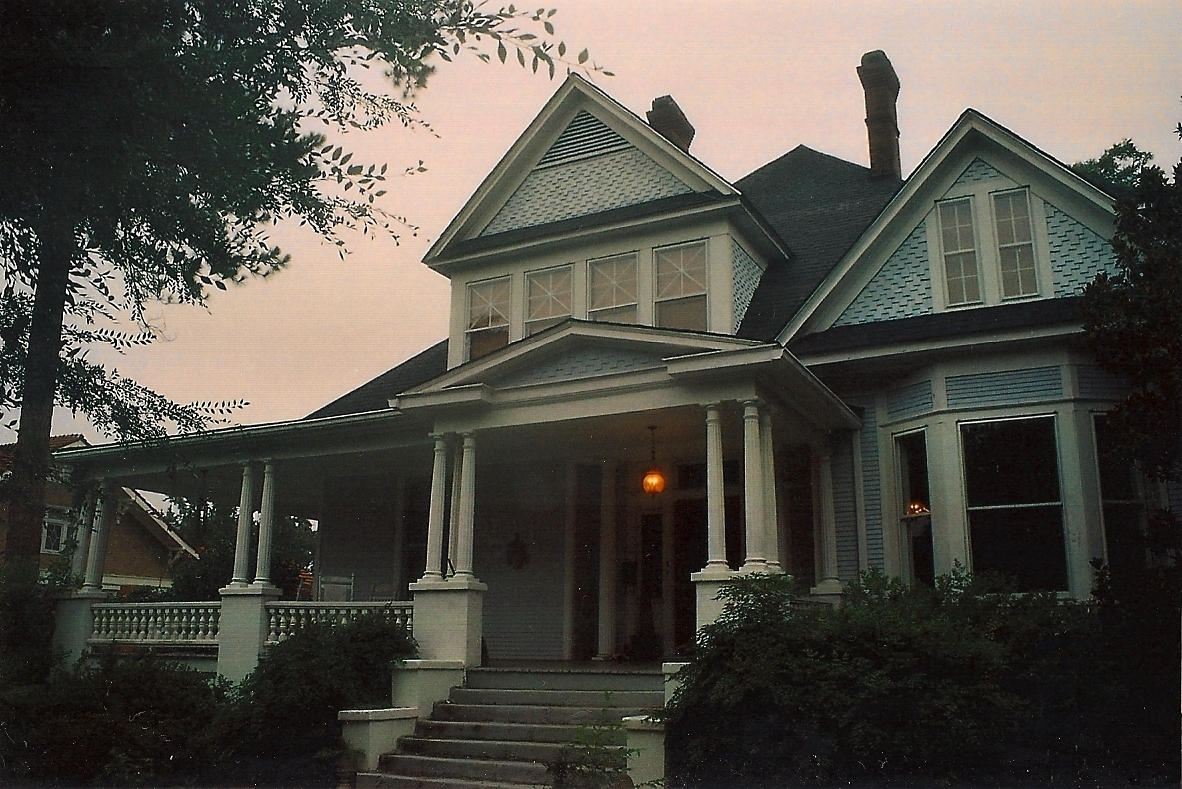
2. 2219 Poplar Springs Rd – 1 1/2-story Queen Anne style cottage.
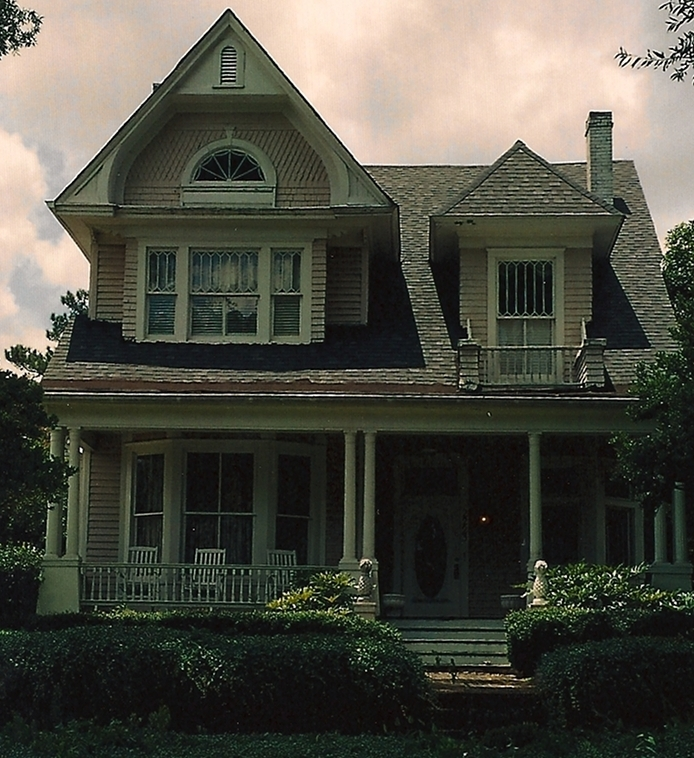
3. 2223 Poplar Springs Rd – 1 1/2-story Queen Anne/Colonial Revival residence.
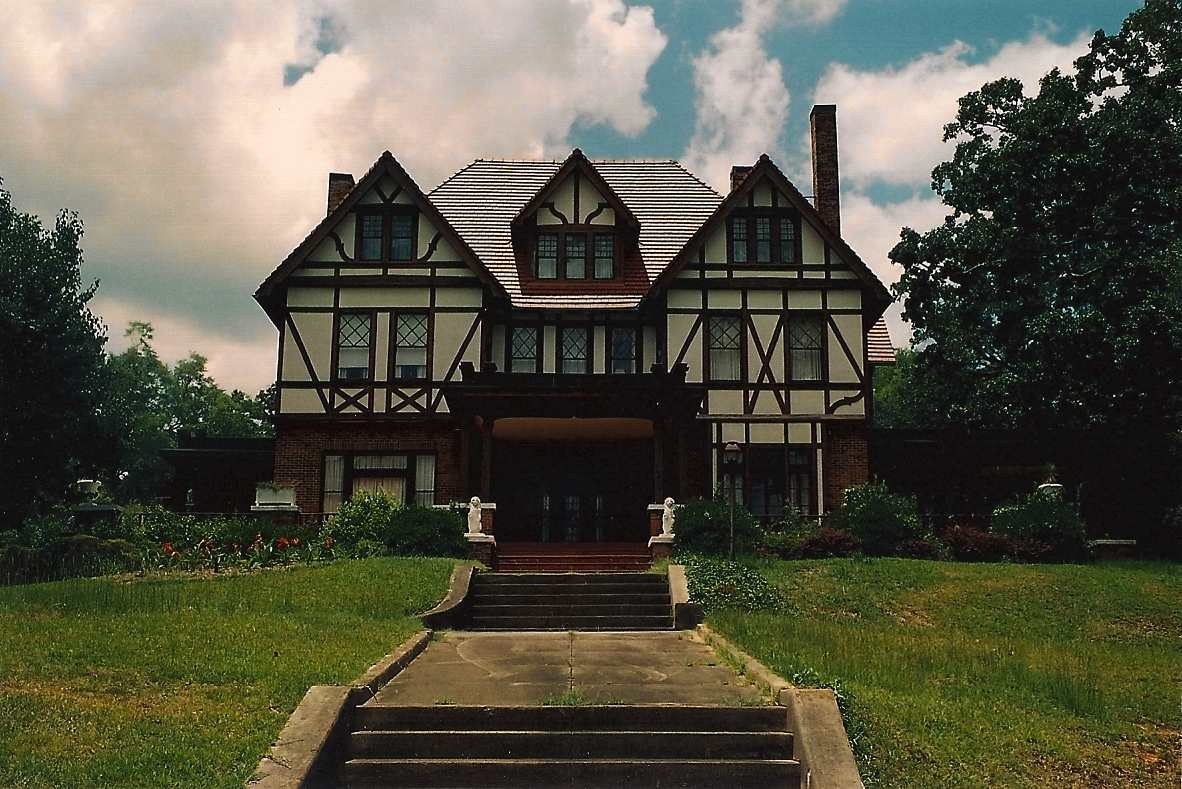
4. 2405 Poplar Springs Rd – 2 1/2-story Tudor Revival residence.
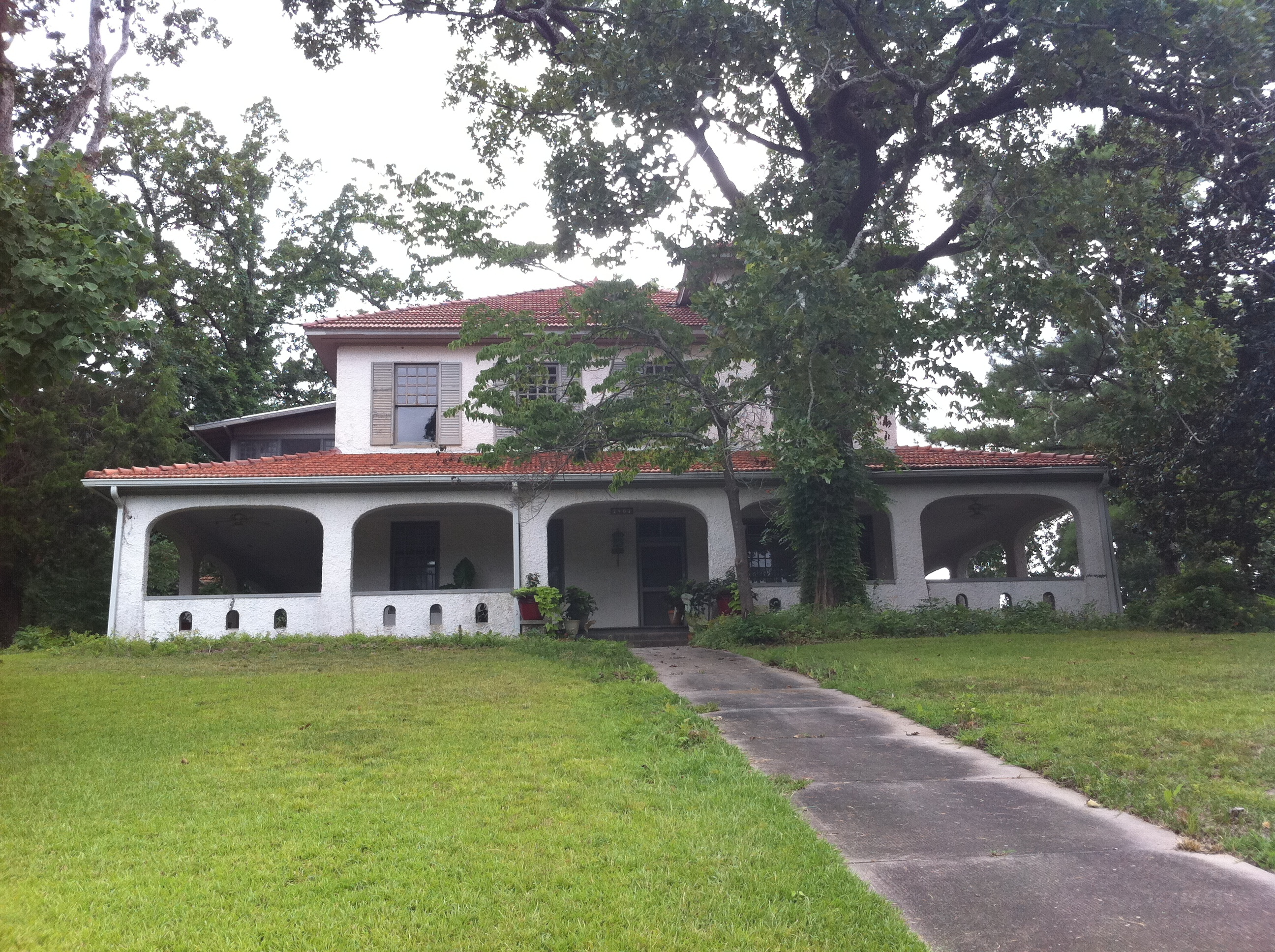
5. 2407 Poplar Springs Rd – Two-story Mission Revival–style residence.
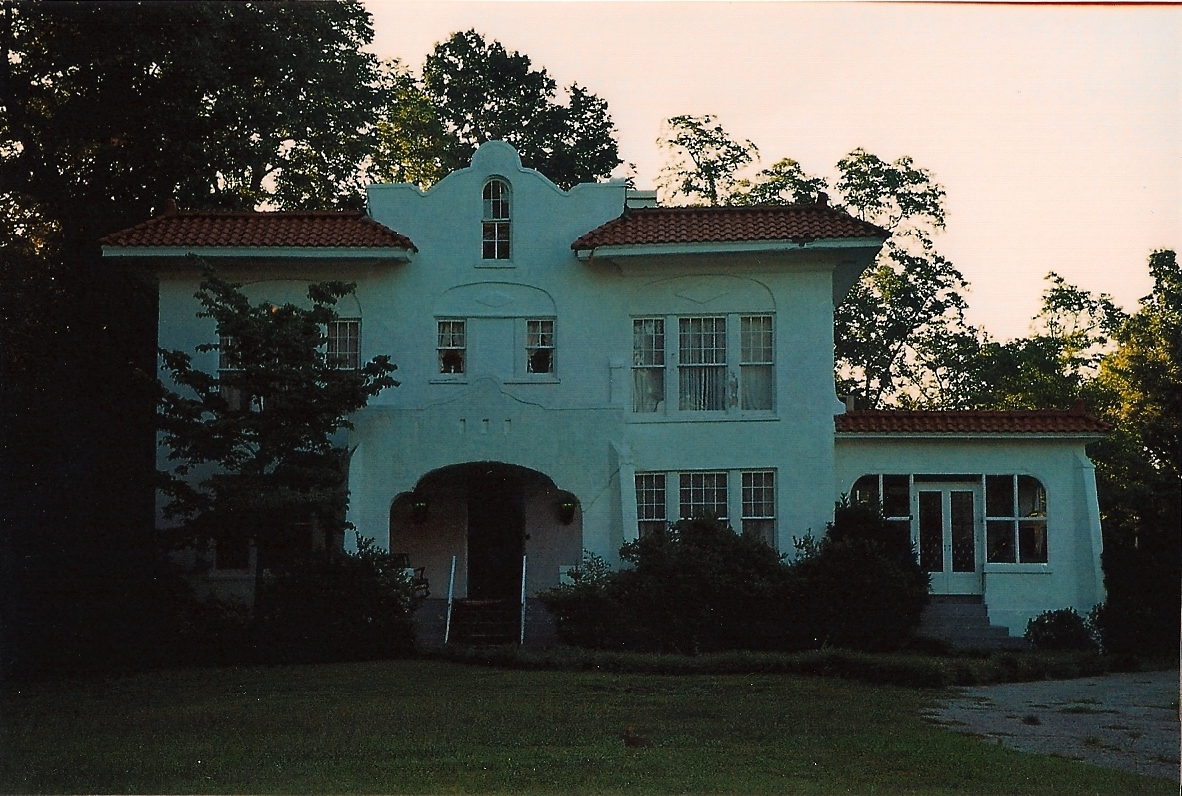
6. 2828 Poplar Springs Rd – Two-story Mission Revival–style residence.

== West End Historic District ==
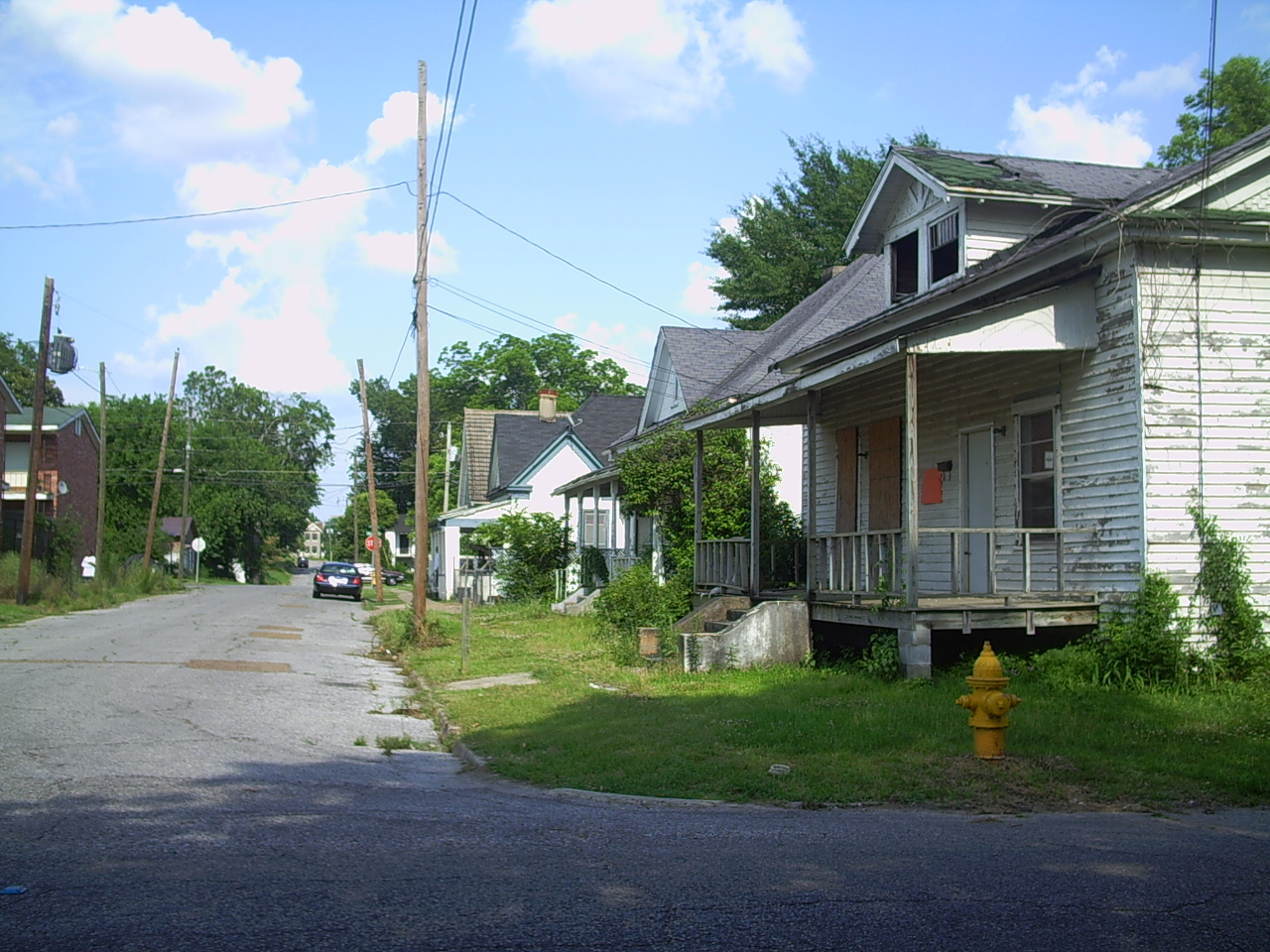
Dilapidated structures in the West End Historic District

West End Historic District is roughly bounded by 7th St to the north, 28th Ave to the east, 5th St to the south, and Shearer's Branch, a small creek in the city, to the west. The 590 acres (2.4 km^{2}) district was added to the National Register of Historic Places on August 21, 1987. With architecture spanning from 1870 to 1936, the district represents the rise of Meridian from its destruction during the American Civil War to the position of Mississippi's largest city. The steady growth of Meridian's economy during this time made possible the expansion of this district.

The history of the district can be traced from Meridian's earliest days, but its significance lies in its large collection of residences dating from 1890 to 1910. Continuous streetscapes of historic buildings built during this time period can be found throughout the district. A typical residence in the city is a Queen Anne cottage with a steep roof line and a porch that has been remodelled in the Craftsman style. Two of the oldest residences in Meridian are in this district, a Greek Revival mansion located at 2721 7th St that was built around 1870 and an Italianate building at 2907 7th St built in 1876.

West End developed as lumbermen, industrial laborers, and railroaders moved west as the city grew. Many of these settlers were Irish Catholics from a small community called Paulding, which was annexed as the city limits expanded. The area was locally called "Irish Alley" and was served by St. Patrick's Roman Catholic Church along with a Catholic convent that has since been demolished.

Structures still standing that are listed as pivotal to the nature of the district include:

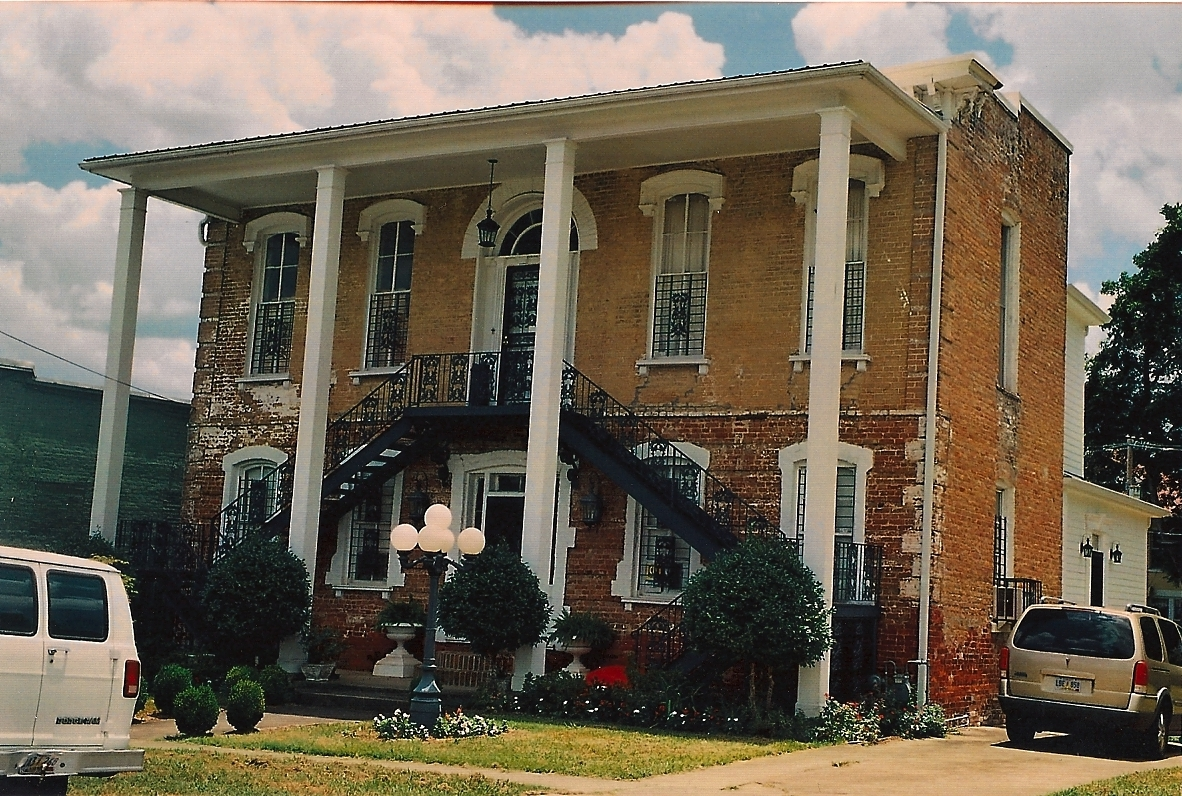
1. 2907 7th St – Two-story Italianate building.

== See also ==
- History of Meridian, Mississippi
- National Register of Historic Places listings in Lauderdale County, Mississippi
