= List of United States post office murals in North Carolina =

Following is a list of United States post office murals created in North Carolina between 1934 and 1943.

| Location | Mural title | Image | Artist | Date | Notes | NRHP listed |
|---|---|---|---|---|---|---|
| Ahoskie | Peanut Harvest | | Julien Binford | | missing | |
| Albemarle | View Near Albemarle | | Louis Ribak | 1939 | oil on canvas | |
| Beaufort | Crissy Wright | Crissy Wright | Simka Simkhovitch | 1940 | oil on canvas | |
| Beaufort | Goose Decoys | Goose Decoys | Simka Simkhovitch | 1940 | oil on canvas | |
| Beaufort | Mail to Cape Lookout | | Simka Simkhovitch | 1940 | oil on canvas | |
| Beaufort | Sand Ponies | | Simka Simkhovitch | 1940 | oil on canvas | |
| Belmont | Mayor Chronicle's South Fork Boys | | Peter DeAnna | 1940 | oil on canvas | |
| Boone | Daniel Boone on a Hunting Trip in Watauga County | | Alan Tompkins | 1940 | oil on canvas Winner of the 48-State Mural Competition | 1996 |
| Brevard | Good News | | Pietro Lazzari | 1941 | glazed tempera | |
| Burlington | Cotton Textiles Historical Railroad Station | | Arthur Bairnsfather | 1940 | oil on canvas | |
| Chapel Hill | Laying the Old Cornerstone of Old East | | Dean Cornwell | 1941 | Old East was the first building at the University of North Carolina at Chapel Hill in October 1793. | |
| Concord | The Spirit of North Carolina | | Edward Buk Ulreich | 1942 | | |
| Gastonia | Cotton Field and Spinning Mill | | Francis Speight | 1938 | oil on canvas | |
| Kings Mountain | Battle of Kings Mountain | | Verona Burkhard | 1939 | | |
| Laurinburg | Fruits of the Land | | Agnes Tait | 1941 | oil on canvas | |
| Lincolnton | Threshing Grain | | Richard Jansen | 1938 | oil on canvas | |
| Louisburg | Tobacco Auction | | Richard Hay Kenah | 1939 | oil on canvas | |
| Madison | Early Summer in North Carolina | | Jean Watson | 1940 | oil on canvas | |
| Mebane | Landscape-Tobacco Curing | | Margaret C. Gates copy by Henry Rood | 1941 | oil on canvas; "destroyed; copy by Henry D. Rood installed in 1964" | |
| Mooresville | North Carolina Cotton Industry | | Alicia Wiencek | 1938 | oil on canvas | |
| Morganton | Sir Walter Raleigh and First Landing on the North Carolina Shore | | Dean Cornwell | 1938 | | |
| New Bern | The Bayard Singleton Case, first printing press in North Carolina, First Provincial Convention in North Carolina (1774) | | David Silvette | 1938 | oil on canvas | |
| Red Springs | War-The Battle of Kittle Raft Swamp The Coming of the Scots Peace- Work and Knowledge | | John W. de Groot | 1941 | | |
| Reidsville | Tobacco | | Gordon Samstag | 1938 | oil on canvas | |
| Roanoke Rapids | Cotton Pickers | | Charles Ward | 1938 | missing | |
| Rockingham | The Past as Connecting Threads in Human Life | | Edward Laning | 1937 | triptych, oil on canvas | |
| Roxboro | Gathering Tobacco | | Allan Gould | 1938 | now at Piedmont Technical Institute | |
| Sanford | The Kinfolk of Virginia Dare | | Pietro Lazzari | 1938 | | |
| Siler City | Building the First House at Siler's Crossroads | | Maxwell B. Starr | 1942 | oil on canvas | |
| Southern Pines | horses | | Joseph Presser | 1943 | oil on canvas | |
| Wake Forest | Richness of the Soil No. 2 | | Harold Egan | 1941 | | |
| Wallace | Daydreams | | G. Glenn Newell | 1941 | oil on canvas | |
| Warrenton | North Carolina Pastoral | | Alice Dineen | 1938 | oil on canvas | |
| Whiteville | Harvesting Tobacco | | Roy Schatt | 1941 | tempera; missing | |
| Williamston | First Flight of the Wright Brothers at Kitty Hawk | | Philip von Saltza | 1940 | oil on canvas; as part of the Williamston Commercial Historic District | 1995 |
| Wilmington | Port of Wilmington | | William Pfohl | 1940 | oil on canvas | |
