= Herman Lee Meader =

American architect and author

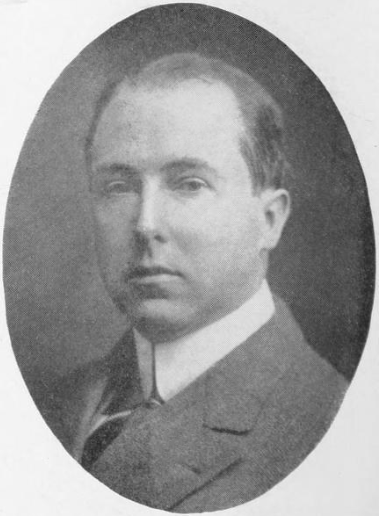
- Born: December 21, 1874; New Orleans, Louisiana, US
- Died: February 14, 1930 (aged 55); New York, New York, US
- Education: Soule Business College; Tulane University; Cornell University; Harvard University
- Occupations: Architect, writer

Herman Lee Meader (December 21, 1874 – February 14, 1930) was an American architect and author.

== Life and career ==
Meader was born in New Orleans, the son of Herman Frederick Louis Meader and Susanne Lee Meader (née Equen). He was educated at Soule Business College and Tulane, Cornell and Harvard Universities, and received a Bachelor of Science from Harvard in 1898. He worked as an architect in New York, first in the office of Ernest Flagg until 1905, and then Raymond Almirall afterwards for about four years. Both Flagg and Almirall were known for terra cotta and color effects in their architecture.

Meader married Queenie Ethel Carr in New York on March 17, 1909. After travelling abroad, he returned to New York in 1913 to start his own practice, receiving commissions to design several prominent buildings in Manhattan, both commercial and residential. He also did much work for the Astor estate, including the Waldorf Hotel at 8 West 33rd Street, then the heart of the fashionable shopping district. Meader lived in the Waldorf Hotel penthouse, where he created a surrounding rooftop Italian garden. There he held elaborate parties which attracted musicians, artists, writers, prizefighters, chess players and others – at one, Meader staged a fight between a black snake and a king snake.

Meader was a member of the Harvard Club, the Strollers Club, the Astor Masonic Lodge, the National Geographic Society and the New York Southern Society. He was also a yachtsman.

== Architecture ==
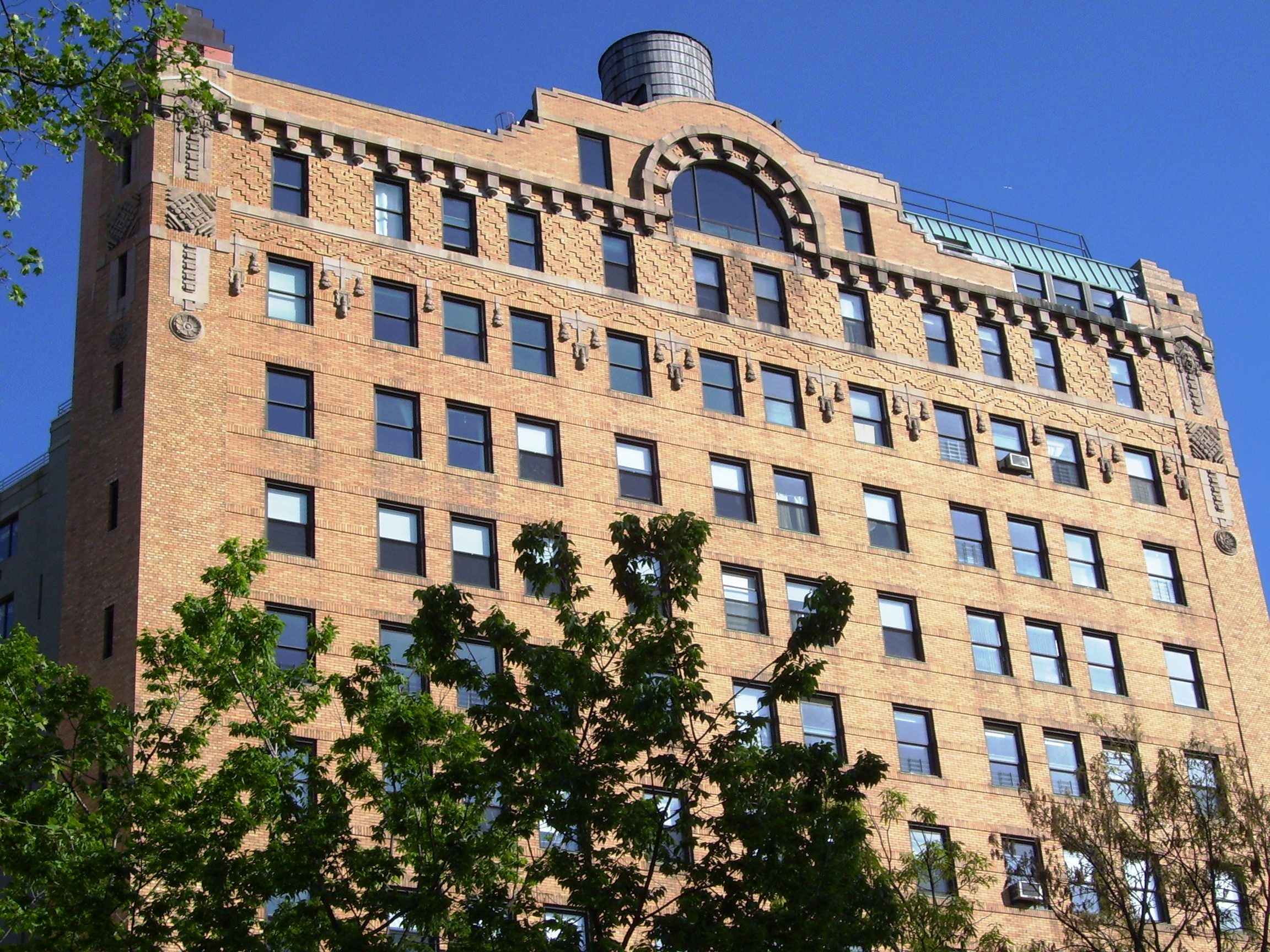
The Cliff Dwelling apartment building at 243 Riverside Drive, built in 1914

Meader was intensely interested in Mayan and Aztec architecture and made regular expeditions to Chichén Itzá in the Yucatán and other sites. Among the buildings he designed are:

- 1907: – Patton House in Greenville, South Carolina, for his sister Bertha E. Meader and her husband, Avery Patton. The American foursquare is platform framed.
- 1913: – 154-160 West 14th Street, a loft building on the corner of Seventh Avenue; designated a New York City landmark on June 28, 2011.
- 1914: – The Cliff Dwelling apartment building at 243 Riverside Drive at 96th Street
- 1915: – 37 West 37th Street between the Avenue of the Americas (Sixth Avenue) and Seventh Avenue
- 1915: – 10 East 39th Street
- 1915-1916: – B.W. Mayer Building at 130 East 25th Street at Lexington Avenue (restored 1995–1996 by Cindy Harden and Jan Van Arnam). Originally an office building, it is currently the Friends House of Rosehill.
- 1917: – 509 Fifth Avenue
- 1917: Greenwich Village Theatre in Sheridan Square at 4th Street and Seventh Avenue; an intimate theatre that seated 450, no longer extant.

Also, in 1920–22, Meader designed an L-shaped addition to the American Surety Company Building at 100 Broadway, fronting both Broadway and Pine Streets, which complemented Bruce Price's original 1894–1896 design. Changes in building codes as well as the necessities of visual balance required Meader to make some alterations to Price's building, such as replacing the original gilded parapet with "an elaborate cornice topped by a row of anthemia" on top of the new two-story penthouse.

== Writings ==
Meader published several collections of epigrams, such as "A rake may be old at 40, but he has a bunch of reminiscences that will cheer him up until he is 60." These titles including Reflections of the morning after (1903), Thro' the rye: more reflections (1906), Cupid the Surgeon (1908), Four Ways to Win a Woman and Alimony. He also wrote the children's book, Motor Goose Rhymes for Motor Ganders (1905) about the dangers of "motoring".

== Gallery ==
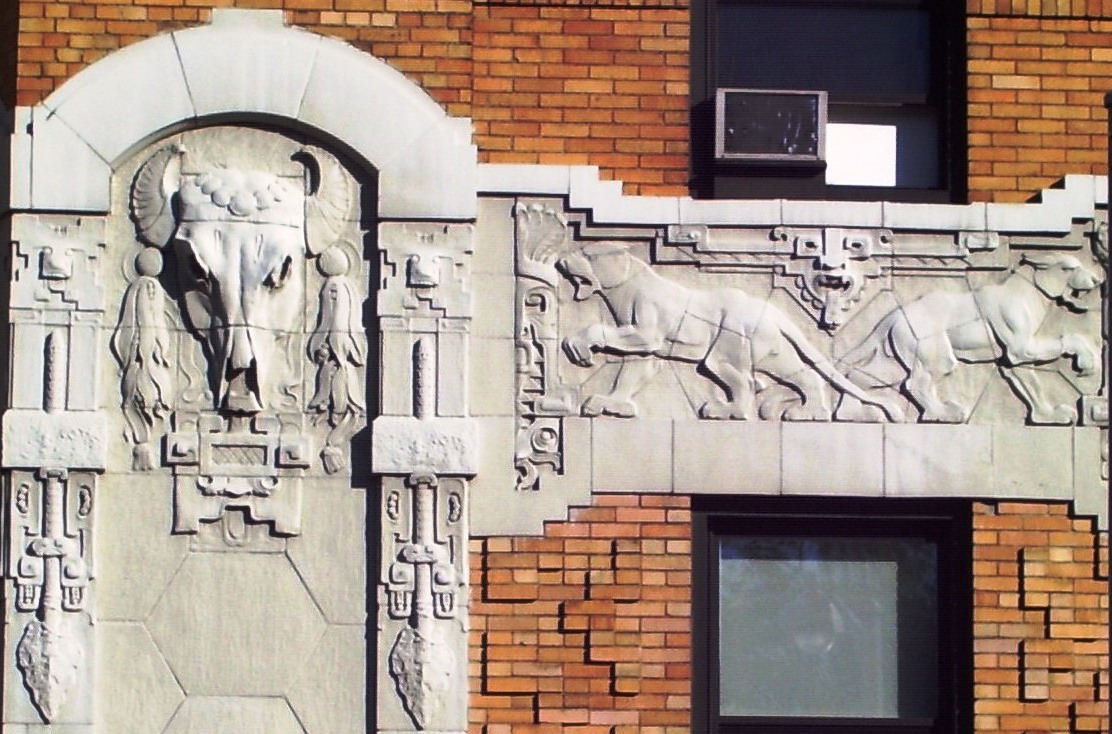
Part of the frieze on the Cliff Dwelling's facade

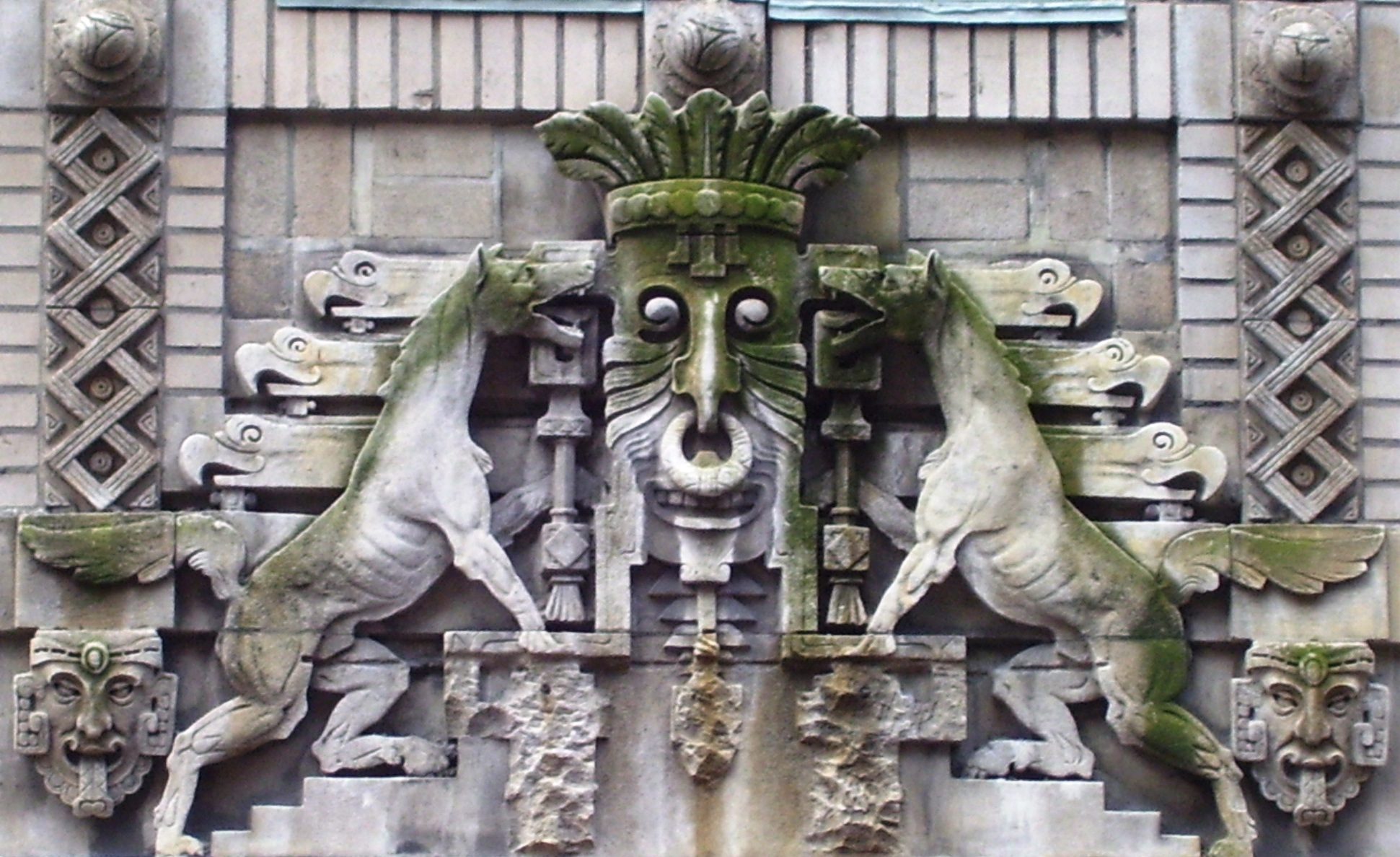
Ornamentation over the entrance to 130 East 25th Street (1915-16), originally an office building, now an AIDS hostel

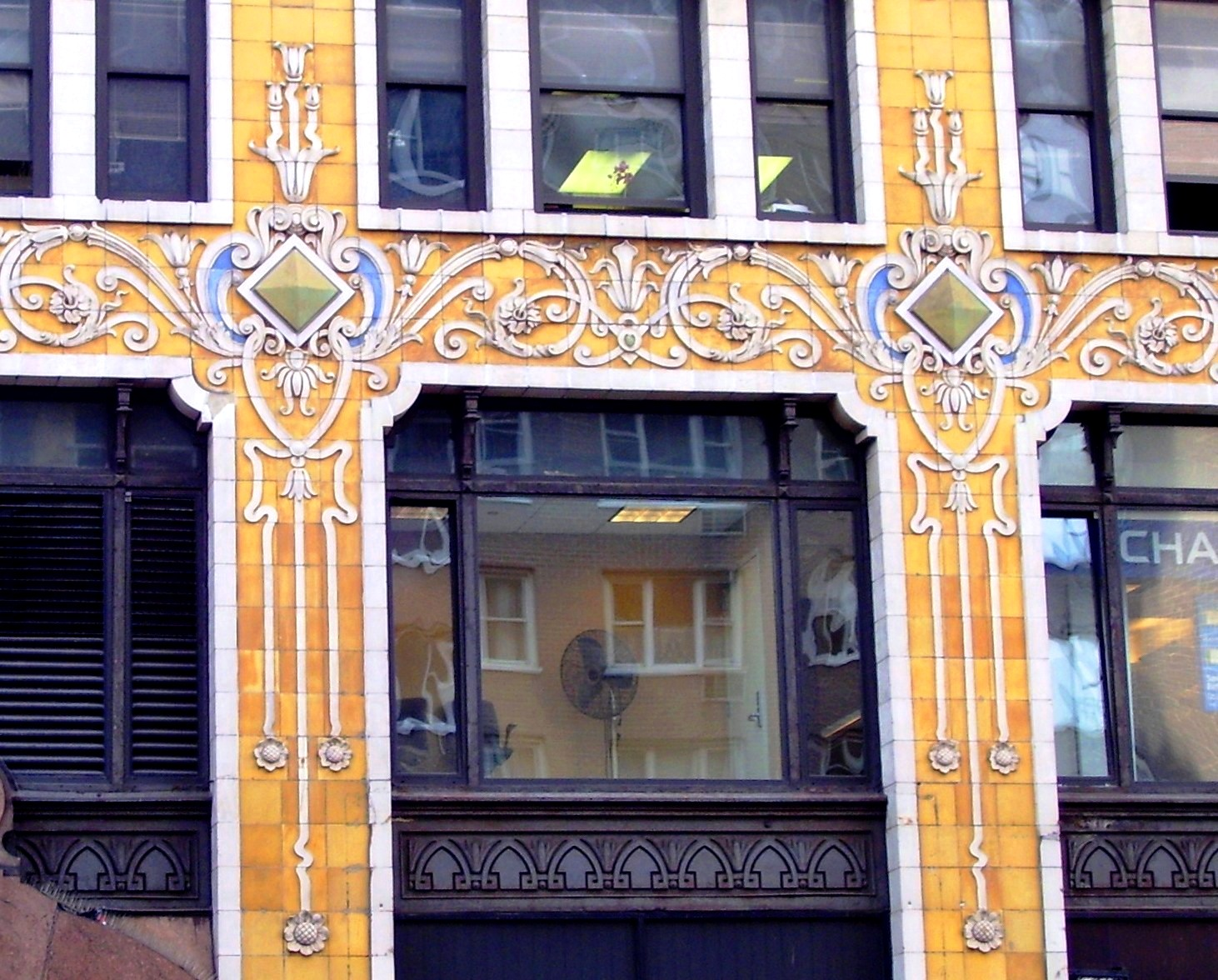
Closeup of the possibly Mayan-inspired decoration on 154-160 West 14th Street (1913)

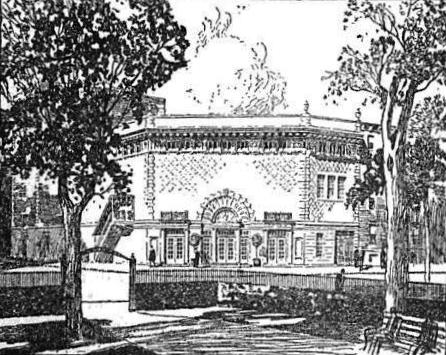
The Greenwich Village Theatre

== Sources ==
- White, Norval; Willensky, Elliot (2000). AIA Guide to New York City (4th ed.). New York: Crown Publishers. ISBN 978-0-8129-3107-5.
