= Old Washington County Library =

- U.S. National Register of Historic Places
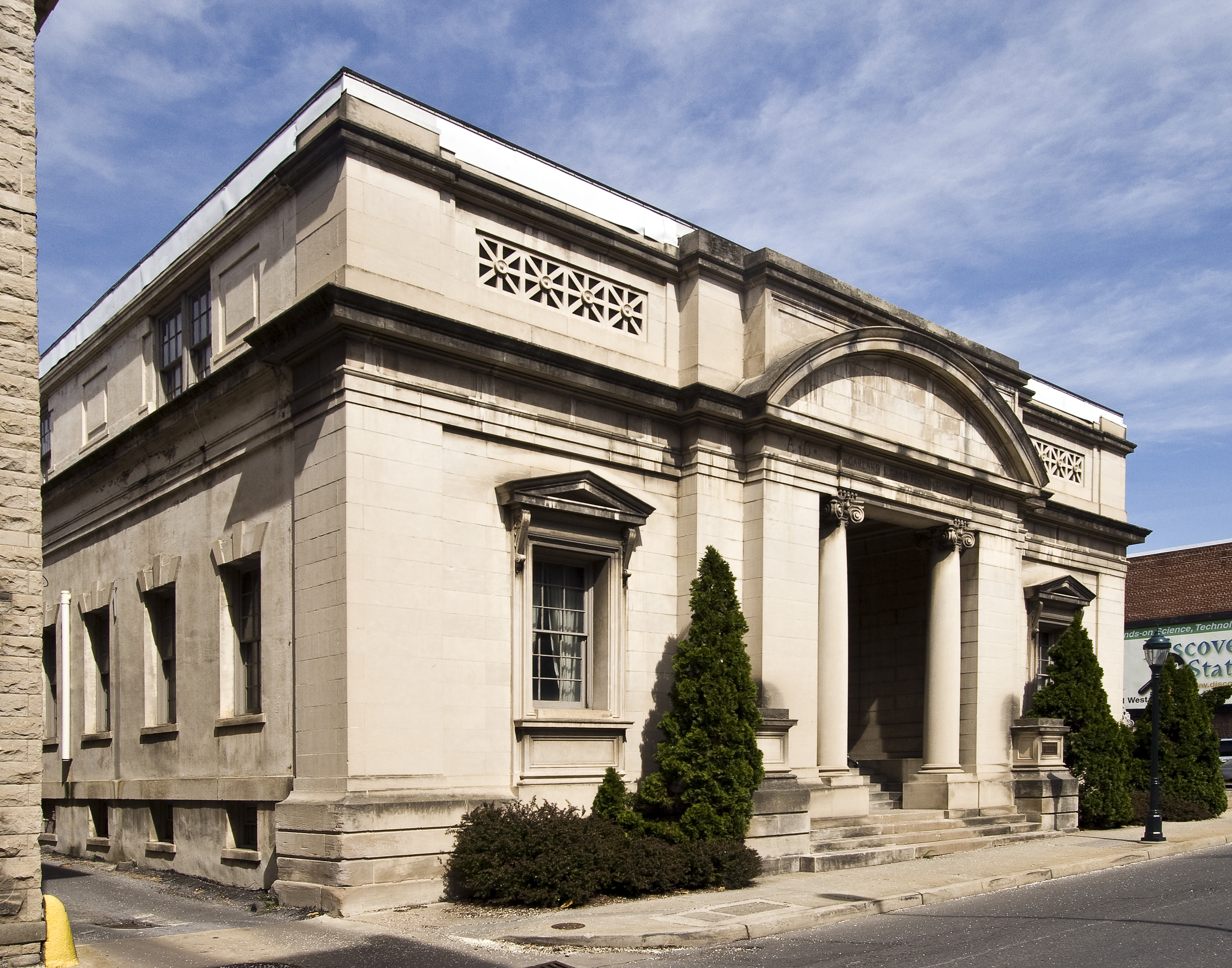
- Old Washington Co Library, April 2010

- Location within Maryland Location within the United States
- Location: 21 Summit Ave., Hagerstown, Maryland
- Coordinates: 39°38′33.66″N 77°43′23.84″W
- Area: less than one acre
- Built: 1900
- Architect: Bruce Price
- Architectural style: Neo-Georgian
- NRHP reference No.: 78001481
- Added to NRHP: October 2, 1978

Old Washington County Library is a historic library building located at 21 Summit Avenue in Hagerstown, Washington County, Maryland, United States. It is a two-story Neo-Georgian stone masonry structure of monumental proportions, built 1900–01. The building appears to be one huge story from the façade. The building was designed by the noted late 19th-century American architect Bruce Price (1845–1903) and erected for the Washington County Free Library. It was used by the library until 1965.

It was listed on the National Register of Historic Places in 1978.
