= Cleftstone =

Historic house in Maine, United States

- U.S. National Register of Historic Places
- Location within Maine Location within the United States
- Location: 92 Eden St., Bar Harbor, Maine
- Coordinates: 44°23′36″N 68°13′19″W
- Area: 0.7 acres (0.28 ha)
- Built: 1881
- Architect: Bruce Price
- Architectural style: Queen Anne style architecture in the United States, Shingle Style
- NRHP reference No.: 99001192
- Added to NRHP: September 24, 1999

Cleftstone is a historic summer house at 92 Eden Street (Maine State Route 3) in Bar Harbor, Maine. Built in 1881 and enlarged in 1894, it is an architecturally eclectic combination of elements from the Shingle, Queen Anne, and Colonial Revival styles. It is now Cleftstone Manor, a hotel with seventeen guest rooms. It was listed on the National Register of Historic Places in 1999.

== Description and history ==
Cleftstone is a large 2 1/2-story wood-frame structure, set on the west side of Eden Street across from the campus of the College of the Atlantic. It is roughly a long, rectangular building, set parallel to the road. Its busy roofline is pierced by a number of cross gables and gabled dormers, with a project section ath the northwest and a large entrance portico roughly in the center of the main (west-facing) facade. A low polygonal tower is located at the northeast corner of the building. The east facade, screened from the road by trees, is relatively undistinguished.

The interior in part reflects the various periods of construction of the building. The downstairs public spaces are elegantly appointed, with Colonial Revival woodwork from its latest period of alteration predominating in the living area and dining room. Remnants of older styles are found elsewhere in the house, including a Queen Anne fireplace mantel in a second-floor bedroom.

The oldest portion of the building was built c. 1880 for the How family, which included Bar Harbor's major real estate developer of the period, Charles How. Design of this structure is attributed to Pennsylvania architect Bruce Price, known for his designs of summer properties. John How sold Cleftstone in 1894 to the Ellis family of Cincinnati, who expanded and altered the property in 1894 and again in 1903. Laura Ellis apparently retained ownership when the couple divorced in 1912. Her heirs sold Cleftstone to Joseph McCaffrey in 1947, shortly before a fire swept through the area, destroying all of the other summer houses in the immediate vicinity. McCaffrey opened the Cleftstone Manor Inn in 1948.

== Facilities ==
The inn has seventeen guest rooms, a formal dining room, breakfast room, and lounge areas. The property has a swimming pool overlooking Frenchman Bay.

== See also ==
- National Register of Historic Places listings in Hancock County, Maine
