= Richard Morris Hunt Memorial =

Memorial in Manhattan, New York, U.S.

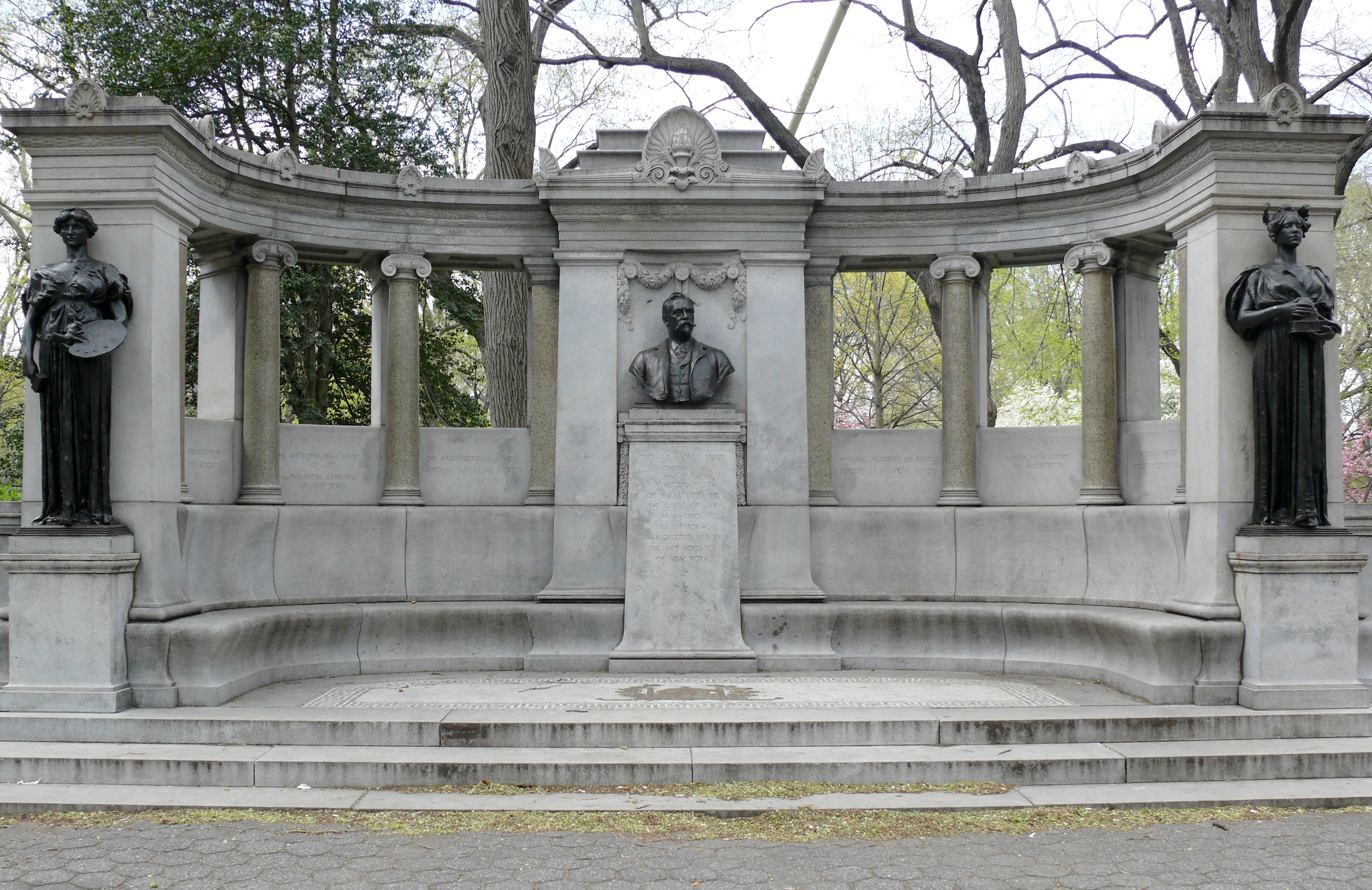
- The memorial in 2012
- Location: New York City, New York, U.S.; 40.7715°N 73.9679°W

The Richard Morris Hunt Memorial is an exedra of granite and marble, dedicated to the memory of the architect Richard Morris Hunt, designed by Bruce Price with three sculptures by Daniel Chester French, a bust of Hunt, and two flanking statues representing (to the left) painting and sculpture (to the right) architecture. The memorial is located at the Central Park perimeter wall, at Fifth Avenue and 70th Street in Manhattan, New York, opposite the site of the Lenox Library which Hunt designed. The bronze sculptures were cast by the Henry-Bonnard Bronze Company of New York.

The monument was commissioned by the Art Societies of New York, a coalition of a number of municipal cultural institutions associated with Hunt: the Century Association, the Municipal Art Society (whose first president, in 1892, was Hunt), the Metropolitan Museum of Art (whose main building was designed by Hunt), the Artist Artisans of New York, the Architectural League, the National Sculpture Society, the National Academy of Design, the Society of American Artists, the American Institute of Architects (co-founded by Hunt in 1857), the American Watercolor Society, and the Society of Beaux-Arts Architects. It was unveiled on October 31, 1898, but not completed until 1901 when the two statutes were installed.

== See also ==
- Public sculptures by Daniel Chester French
