= Simka Simkhovitch =

Russian artist (1885-1949)

- 1941
- Born: (Симха Файбусович Симхович); 2 June 1885 N.S. Novozybkov, Russia
- Died: 25 February 1949 (aged 63); Greenwich, Connecticut
- Other names: Simcha Faibusovich Simkhovich, Gospodin Simkhovich
- Occupation: artist
- Years active: 1918-1949

Simka Simkhovitch (Симха Файбусович Симхович) (aka Simka Faibusovich Simkhovich) (Novozybkov, Russia May 21, 1885 O.S./June 2, 1885 N.S.—Greenwich, Connecticut February 25, 1949) was a Russian artist and immigrant to the United States. He painted theater scenery in his early career and then had several showings in galleries in New York City. Winning Works Progress Administration commissions in the 1930s, he completed murals for the post offices in Jackson, Mississippi and Beaufort, North Carolina. His works are in the permanent collections of the Dallas Museum of Art, the National Museum of American Art and the Whitney Museum of American Art.

== Biography ==
Simka Faibusovich Simkhovitch was born on May 21, 1885 O.S./June 2, 1885 N.S. into a Jewish family in Novozybkov, Russia, who owned a small department store. During a severe case of measles when he was seven, Simkhovitch sketched the views outside his window and decided to become an artist, over his father's objections. Beginning in 1905, he studied at the Grekov Odessa Art School and upon completion of his studies in 1911 received a recommendation to be admitted to the Imperial Academy of Arts. Though he enrolled to begin classes in architecture, painting, and sculpture at the Imperial Academy, he was dropped from the school roster in December because of the quota on the number of Jewish students and drafted into the army. Simkhovitch served as a private in the 175th Infantry Regiment Baturyn until his demobilization in 1912. Re-enrolling in the Imperial Academy, he audited classes.

== Career ==
Simkhovitch exhibited paintings and sculptures in 1918 as part of an exhibition of Jewish artists and in 1919 placed 1st in the competition "The Great Russian Revolution" with a painting called "Russian Revolution" which was hung in the State Museum of Revolution. In 1922, Simkhovitch exhibited at the International Book Fair in Florence (Italian: Fiera Internazionale del Libro di Firenze). In 1924, Simkhovitch came to the United States to make illustrations for Soviet textbooks and decided to immigrate instead. Initially he supported himself by doing commercial art and a few portrait commissions. In 1927, he was hired to paint a screen for a scene in the play "The Command to Love" by Fritz Gottwald and Rudolph Lothar which was playing at the Longacre Theatre on Broadway. Art dealers began clamoring for the screen and Simkhovitch began a career as a screen painter for the theater. Catching the attention of the screenwriter Ernest Pascal, he worked as an illustrator for Pascal, who then introduced him to gallery owner, Marie Sterner. Simkhovitch's works appeared at the Marie Sterner Gallery beginning with a 1927 exhibit and were repeated the following year. Simkhovitch had an exhibit in 1929 at Sterner's on circus paintings. In 1931, he held a showing of works at the Helen Hackett Gallery, in New York City and later that same year he was one of the featured artists of a special exhibit in San Francisco at the California Palace of the Legion of Honor in Lincoln Park. The exhibit was coordinated by Marie Sterner and included four watercolors, including one titled "Nudes".

In 1936, Simkhovitch was selected to complete the mural for the WPA Post office project in Jackson, Mississippi. The mural was hung in the post office and courthouse in 1938 depicted a plantation theme. In the 1970s, it was the source of repeated controversy for its depiction of stereotypical imagery and during various courthouse remodels was covered. The following year, his painting "Holiday" won praise at an exhibition in Lincoln, Nebraska. In 1940, Simkhovitch's second WPA post office project was completed when four murals, "The Cape Lookout Lighthouse and the Orville W. Mail Boat", "The Wreck of the Crissie Wright", "Sand Ponies" and "Canada Geese" were installed in Beaufort, North Carolina. The works were commissioned in 1938 and did not generate the controversy that the Jackson mural had. The main mural is "The Wreck of the Crissie Wright" and depicts a shipwreck which had occurred in Beaufort in 1866. "The Cape Lookout Lighthouse and the Orville W. Mail Boat" depicted the lighthouse built in 1859 and the mail boat that was running mail during the time which Simkhovitch was there. The boat ran mail for the area until 1957. "Sand Ponies" shows the wild horses common to the North Carolina barrier islands and "Canada Geese" showed the importance of hunting and fishing in the area. All four murals were restored in the 1990s by Elisabeth Speight, daughter of two other WPA muralists, Francis Speight and his wife Sarah Jane Blakeslee.

Simkhovitch's work was selected for a Life Magazine article and in 1940 the artists whose work would appear were highlighted in an exhibit at Morrill Hall on the campus of the University of Nebraska. He also had a one-man show that year in Manhattan. The 4-page Life feature appeared in the December 29, 1941 edition of the magazine and showed Simkhovich's home and studio in Greenwich, Connecticut as well as photographs of his wife, the model Elsa Forne, and two of their three daughters, Sonya and Naomi. Simkhovitch continued to paint and do illustrations. In 1946, he sold a painting "Sonya with Fruit" to Upjohn to use in cough medicine advertising, which was included in an exhibit of the Upjohn Collection. The following year, he did his first gallery showing in Connecticut at the Sterling House in Stratford. In February 1949, Simkhovitch and his wife bought a new home in Milford, Connecticut, but Simkhovitch contracted pneumonia during the move. He died after a brief illness on 25 February 1949 in Greenwich, Connecticut.

== Legacy ==
Subsequent to his death, Simkhovitch's papers were donated to the Archives of American Art at the Smithsonian Institution in 1989. His works are part of the permanent collections of the Dallas Museum of Art, the National Museum of American Art and the Whitney Museum of American Art, as well as other collections.
