= American Surety Building =

Office building in Manhattan, New York

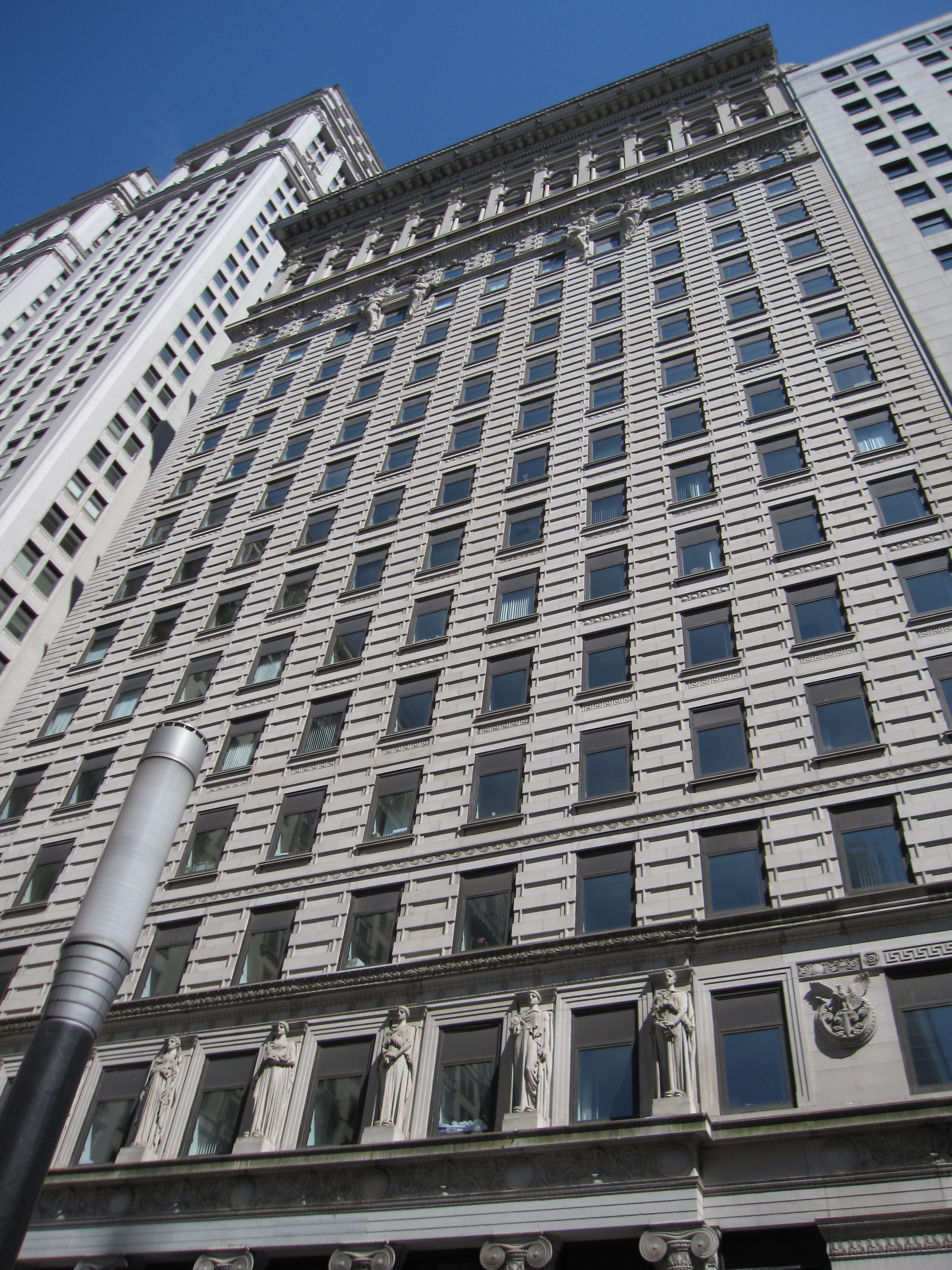
- American Surety Building
- Interactive map of the American Surety Building area
- Alternative names: Bank of Tokyo Building, 100 Broadway

General information
- Status: Completed
- Type: Office
- Architectural style: Neoclassical
- Location: 96–100 Broadway; Manhattan, New York
- Coordinates: 40°42′29″N 74°00′40″W
- Construction started: 1894
- Completed: 1896
- Renovated: 1920–1922, 1973–1975
- Cost: $57 million
- Owner: Northwood Investors

Height
- Height: 338 ft (103 m)

Technical details
- Floor count: 23
- Lifts/elevators: 10

Design and construction
- Architect: Bruce Price
- Developer: American Surety Company

Renovating team
- Architects: Herman Lee Meader (first renovation); Kajima International (second renovation)

New York City Landmark
- Designated: June 24, 1997
- Reference no.: 1924

The American Surety Building (also known as the Bank of Tokyo Building or 100 Broadway) is an office building and early skyscraper at Pine Street and Broadway in the Financial District of Manhattan in New York City, across from Trinity Church. The building was designed in a Neo-Renaissance style by Bruce Price with a later expansion by Herman Lee Meader. It is 388 feet (118 m) tall, with either 23 or 26 stories. It was one of Manhattan's first buildings with steel framing and curtain wall construction.

The American Surety Building contains a facade of Maine granite. Its articulation consists of three horizontal sections similar to the components of a column, namely a base, shaft, and capital, making the American Surety Building one of the earliest New York City skyscrapers to feature such a layout. The facade contains several ornamental features, including sculptural elements designed by J. Massey Rhind. In addition, the American Surety Building uses an interior skeleton of structural steel, as well as a cantilevered steel structure for its foundations.

The building was erected between 1894 and 1896 as a 21-story structure, which was the second tallest building in New York City when completed. Between 1920 and 1922, an annex was built to designs by Meader, increasing the floor area and adding two stories to the building. A later tenant, the Bank of Tokyo, hired Kajima International to restore the lower 13 stories between 1973 and 1975. The American Surety Building was made a New York City designated landmark in 1995.

== Site ==
The American Surety Building is located in the Financial District of Lower Manhattan, adjacent to Broadway to the west and Pine Street to the north, with Wall Street less than a block to the south. The building is adjacent to Trinity Church, Trinity's churchyard, and the Trinity and United States Realty Buildings to the west; the Equitable Building to the north; 14 Wall Street to the east; and 1 Wall Street to the south. Entrances to the New York City Subway's Wall Street station, served by the 4 and 5 trains, are adjacent to the building.

The lot covers about 15,000 square feet (1,400 m^{2}), and measures 125 feet (38 m) on Pine Street and 123 feet (37 m) on Broadway. None of the sides are parallel. The original lot, prior to the building's 1920–1922 expansion, measured 84.67 by 85.33 feet (26 by 26 m).

== Architecture ==
The American Surety Building is either 23 or 26 stories tall, (Note: The New York City Landmarks Preservation Commission cites the building as having 23 stories. Emporis, as well as architectural writers Sarah Landau and Carl Condit, give a height of 26 stories.) with a height of 338 feet (103 m). It was designed by Bruce Price in the Neo-Renaissance style. Upon completion, the American Surety Building was 21 stories tall with a height of either 308 or 312 feet (94 or 95 m). This made it New York City's second tallest building, behind the now-demolished Manhattan Life Insurance Building one block south, which stood at 313 feet (95 m).

At the time of the American Surety Building's development in the 1890s, new buildings in New York City were starting to use steel frames, and caisson foundation technology was still relatively new. The American Surety Building was the first New York City skyscraper to use a full steel skeleton. (Note: The now-demolished Tower Building, erected in 1888, had used a partial iron skeleton.) The American Surety Building was also one of the earliest buildings on street corners whose articulation consisted of three horizontal sections similar to the components of a column (namely a base, shaft, and capital). The design inspired those of other "tower" skyscrapers in the United States during the early 20th century.

=== Facade ===
The facade consists of Maine granite with a 3-story base, a 12-story shaft, and a 6-story capital, with two transitional stories at the 4th and 15th floors. A two-story penthouse is set back above the 21st floor. The Broadway and Pine Street elevations were both seven bays wide before an expansion in 1920–1922 brought the building to 11 bays on both sides. Price said that he wanted to "design a monumental structure", and as such he intended the facade to resemble "a campanile with four pilaster faces, the seven flutes represented by seven rows of windows". The windows on upper stories were originally progressively recessed by 1 inch (25 mm) per story, so that the 20th floor windows were recessed by 20 inches (510 mm); this allowed sunlight to illuminate the upper stories while utilizing entasis for architectural effect. These windows were subsequently replaced with sash windows. Unlike previous buildings such as the Park Row Building, which typically only had one decorated facade, the American Surety Building had all of its facades decorated.

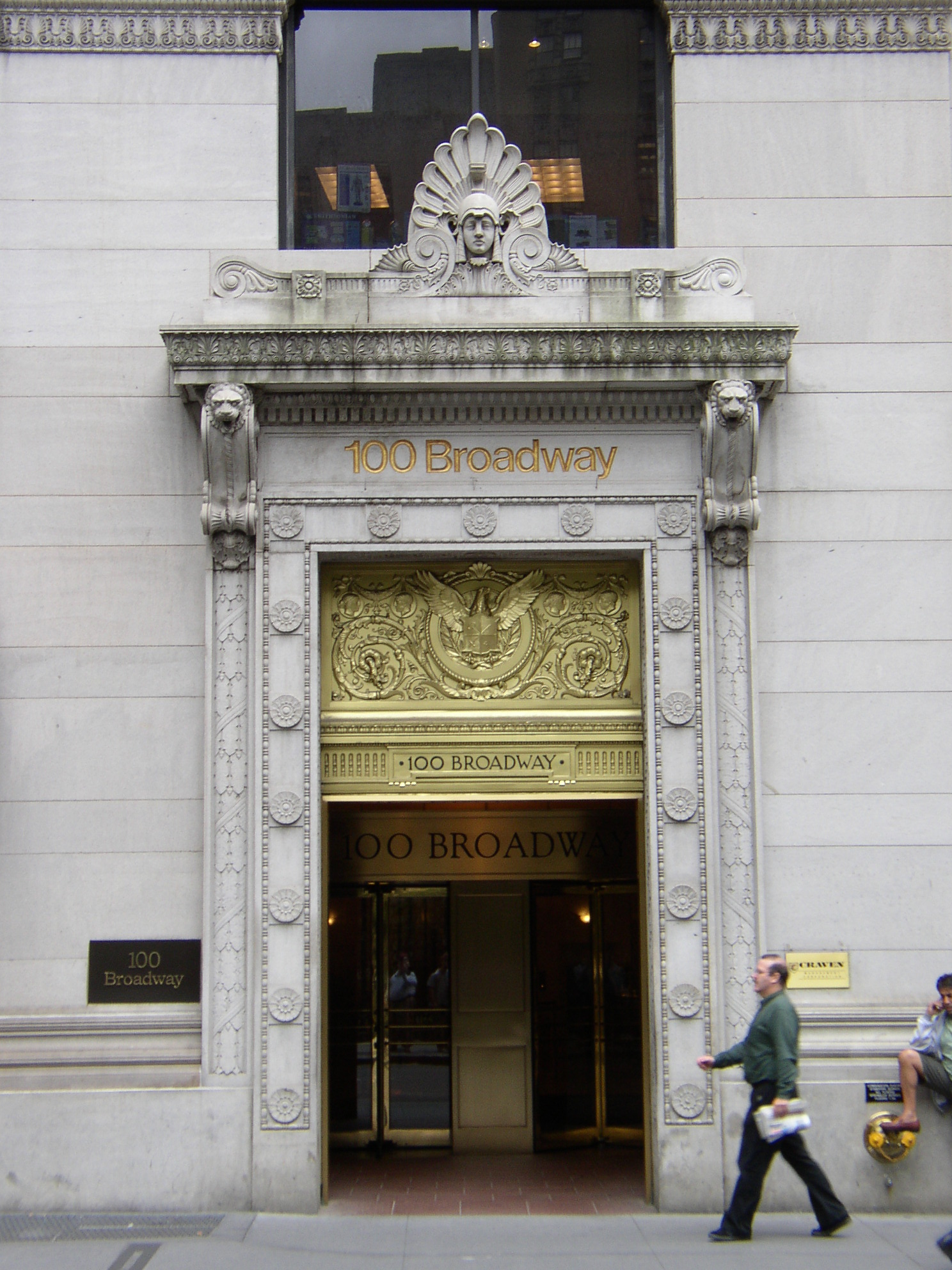
Office entrance

The main entrance is located on Broadway and consists of a two-story Ionic-style colonnade supporting a seven-bay-wide portico; this portico was five bays wide prior to the expansion. The third-story windows above the portico are flanked by six classical figures designed by J. Massey Rhind. Two more figures, in the same style as Rhind's originals, were added in the expansion. At the top of the colonnade is an elaborate frieze. The Broadway facade also has an entrance to the upper floors at its southern end. On Pine Street, the lowest two stories are supported by two-story piers above a granite water table, supporting an entablature that wraps around from Broadway. There is a service entrance on the east end of the Pine Street facade, and the third-story windows on this facade have projecting window surrounds with connecting spandrel panels. An entablature runs above the third story on Pine Street and Broadway.

The facades of the intermediate stories contain slightly projecting horizontal bands. A band course runs above the fourth story on the Broadway and Pine Street facades. There are sculptures extending across the 14th and 15th stories, connecting the intermediate floors to the transitional 15th story. The top six stories were treated as a "cap" with Corinthian style pilasters forming a colonnade; a parapet between the 20th and 21st stories with gilded metal; and a large projecting stone cornice atop the 21st floor. The original gilded parapet and the sculptures were removed in the 1920–1922 expansion, and a cornice with anthemia was installed atop the two-story penthouse. The southern elevation of the 20th and 21st floors, from Price's original design, remains partially visible from the street.

=== Foundation ===
Contractor Charles Sooysmith designed the foundation, which was a mix of grillage and caissons. Sooysmith was among the first builders to use pneumatic caissons for foundations, having used them in other projects such as the Manhattan Life Insurance Building. The caissons were sunken to stone beds between 71 and 79 feet (22 and 24 m) deep, where the layer of bedrock was situated. Each caisson was 9 feet (2.7 m) tall and made of 0.5-inch-thick (13 mm) steel plates. A steel shaft with a cross section of 3 by 5 feet (0.91 by 1.52 m) rose from each of the caissons, and was topped by a cylinder of 6 feet (1.8 m) in diameter by 10 feet (3.0 m) tall. The underlying ground was drawn out from the caissons, and then filled with concrete. Thirteen brick piers were subsequently built around the caisson shafts.

The building's internal steel structure is cantilevered over the foundation piers due to the presence of other structures nearby when the American Surety Building was erected. The internal structure was designed to be completely separate from the surrounding buildings, and thus party walls could not be used. A steel plate was placed atop the masonry tips of each pier. A grillage of transversely laid I-beams was installed above the plates. Deep plate girders were placed over the grillages, and the cantilevers extended outward from these girders to the edge of the building footprint, where they supported the columns of the superstructure. At the time of the American Surety Building's construction, there was already discussion on building a subway line under Broadway (which would become the Lexington Avenue Line, served by the 4 and 5 trains), and a building representative said in 1897 that the foundation was designed "with a view of withstanding the effect" of a subway tunnel.

=== Features ===
==== Structural features ====
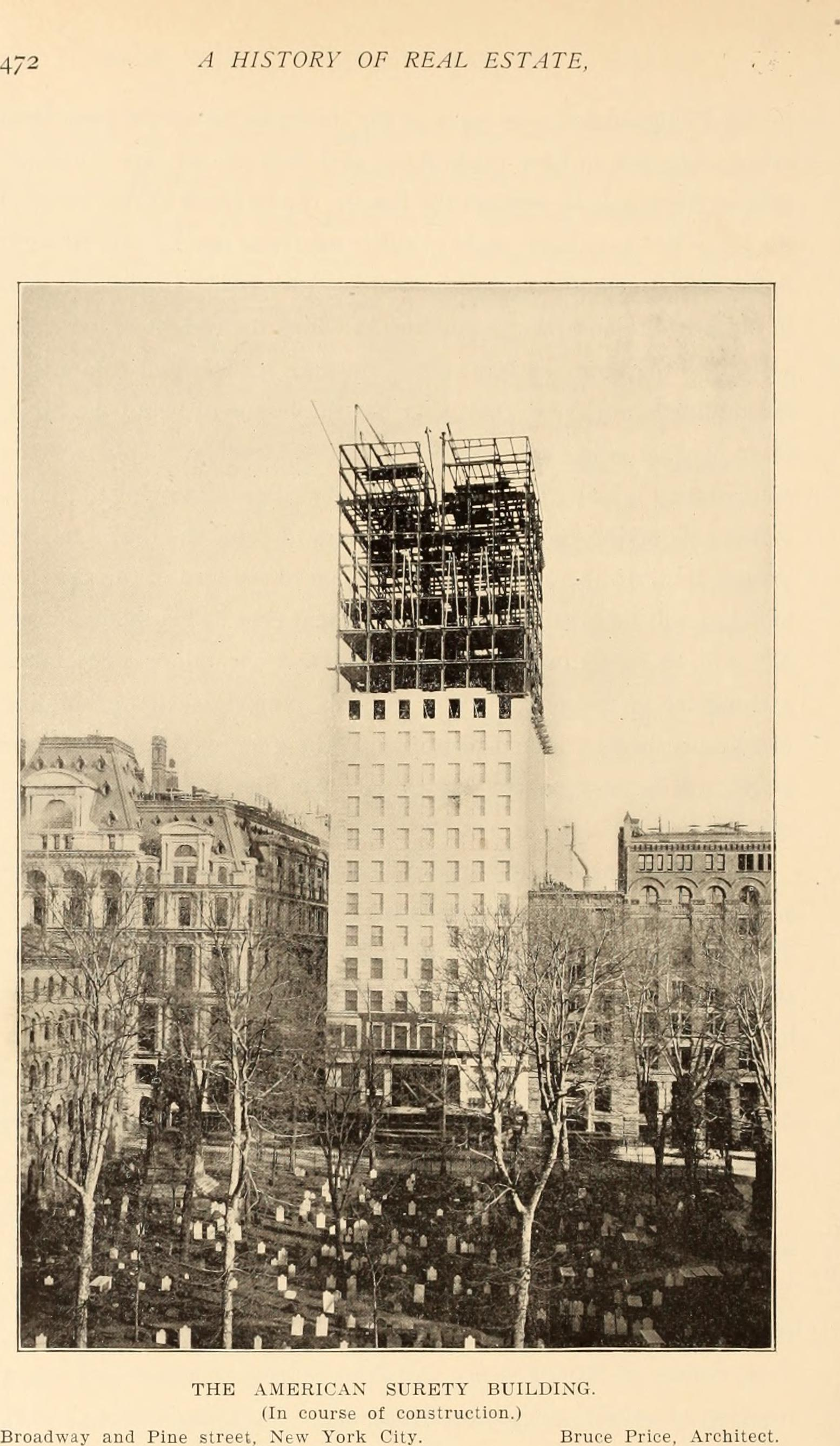
Depiction of the American Surety Building's construction

Thirty-two structural columns were used in the building, which each carry between 584 and 1,280 short tons (521 and 1,143 long tons; 530 and 1,161 t). The building utilized portal wind bracing, which could sustain winds of at least 82 miles per hour (132 km/h); this was demonstrated during January 1896, when the building was subjected to that wind speed with minimal evidence of oscillation. Exposed steel beams were covered with 3.5-inch-thick (89 mm) fireproof tile, while the floor arches were made of 10-inch-thick (250 mm) firebrick. The floors themselves were made of brick arches, concrete and ash aggregate, and steel joints, covered with a marble finish.

The northern and western elevations were curtain walls, as were the eastern and southern elevations above the eighth story. Between the first and eighth stories, the eastern and southern walls were load-bearing brick walls. The southern brick wall was 4 feet (1.2 m) thick to prevent fire from spreading to the Schermerhorn Building to the south. At the time of the building's construction, the thickness of a curtain wall was limited to 32 inches (810 mm), imposing a force of 80,000 pounds per foot (120,000 kg/m) on the foundation. If the walls had been load-bearing, then they would have needed to be 84 inches (2,100 mm) thick, imposing a force of 150,000 pounds per foot (220,000 kg/m) on the foundation. Due to the use of non-load-bearing curtain walls, an additional 87 square feet (8.1 m^{2}) of usable space was provided in the width of each 20-foot (6.1 m) bay, resulting in a profit of $2,000 per year from the rental of the additional space. Foundation costs were also reduced, although the use of a steel frame canceled out some of the cost savings, since steel was slightly costlier than masonry. The usage of both curtain and bearing walls was not common at the time of the building's construction.

==== Interior ====
The American Surety Building had more than 400 rooms upon completion, accessed by six elevators and a spiral staircase. The elevators moved at 400 feet per minute (120 m/min), which was then considered very rapid. There were two water tanks, one each on the 10th and 21st floors, which had a cumulative capacity of 50,000 U.S. gallons (190,000 L; 42,000 imp gal) and supplied water to fire hoses on each floor. The 21st floor was used solely as a utility floor. The 10th-floor tank was used to reduce the maximum water pressure in the American Surety Building's pipes.

When the building was expanded in 1920, a two-story penthouse was added, with 6,500 square feet (600 m^{2}) of restaurant space on each floor. The rental space on the 1st through 7th floors was expanded from 4,316 to 12,000 square feet (401.0 to 1,114.8 m^{2}), and above the 7th floor, the rental space was expanded to 11,000 square feet (1,000 m^{2}). The expanded building had ten elevators clustered on the north side of the building, as well as two staircases at the northwest and southeast corners.

The lobby has a black-and-gold coffered ceiling with a baby-centaur frieze. The ground level contains a large open arcade with 30-foot-tall (9.1 m) ceilings. There was previously a banking room at street level, which contained a gold-leaf ceiling supported by four marble pillars. This banking room was removed in a 1970s renovation and replaced with the open arcade.

== History ==
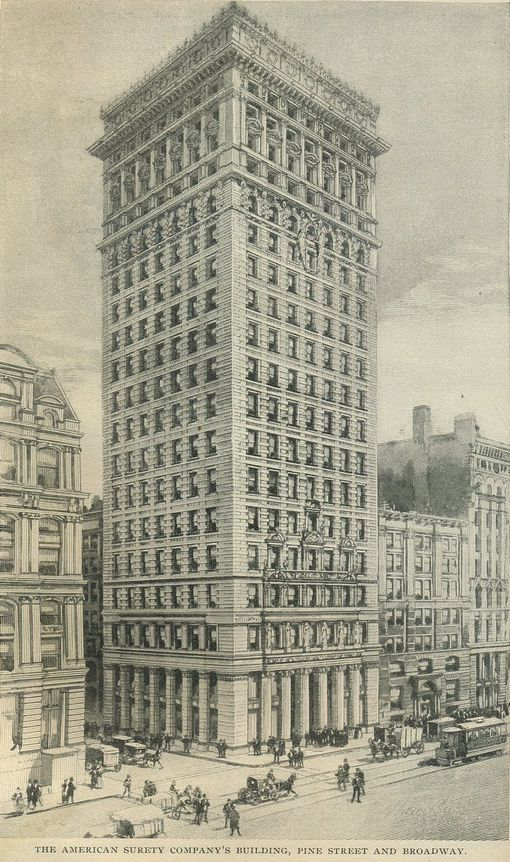
1898 drawing of the American Surety Building

During the late 19th century, life insurance firms were some of the first companies to build high-profile skyscrapers. At the time of the American Surety Building's construction, life insurance companies generally had their own buildings for their offices and branch locations. According to architectural writer Kenneth Gibbs, these buildings allowed each individual company to instill "not only its name but also a favorable impression of its operations" in the general public. This had been a trend since 1870, with the completion of the former Equitable Life Building just north of the American Surety site.

In the second half of the century, many firms in the Financial District were developing structures north of the neighborhood's traditional center of commerce at Wall Street. By 1865, the three-block of stretch of Broadway between Liberty and Wall Streets had seven buildings for banks or insurance companies, including the Continental Insurance Company Building at 100-102 Broadway, on the American Surety Building's future site. Fire insurance companies established buildings on Pine Street as well. The American Surety Company was one of the insurance firms located within the Financial District, having been established in 1881 at 160 Broadway.

=== Construction and early use ===
The American Surety Company bought two lots at Broadway and Pine Street in 1893: an L-shaped lot with frontage on both streets, and another lot at the corner. The price of the latter—$400,000, equivalent to $12,454,591 in 2024 (Note: This amounted to $282 per square foot ($3,040/m^{2}), equivalent to $8,780 per square foot ($94,500/m^{2}) in 2024. (Note: Johnston, Louis; Williamson, Samuel H. (2023). "What Was the U.S. GDP Then?". MeasuringWorth. United States Gross Domestic Product deflator figures follow the MeasuringWorth series.))—was the largest price ever paid for a Broadway property at the time. The same year, the company announced that it wanted to build a 15-to-20-story headquarters tower, to be built on their lot measuring 100 by 85 feet (30 by 26 m). The company organized an architectural design competition, in which the contestants were directed to design a building to maximize the amount of space that could be rented, while still being architecturally consistent on the outside. Nine architects entered this competition, including Bruce Price, Napoleon LeBrun, George B. Post, Carrère and Hastings, and McKim, Mead & White. A separate competition was held for the decorative figures, which Rhind won.

In February 1894, the company announced that Price had been selected to build American Surety's 20-story headquarters. Price's design called for a relatively simple building with a flat roof, and took inspiration from his previous commission for 280 Broadway. This appealed to the American Surety Company, because the site had supposedly cost $1.435 million and the company planned to spend another $1.25 million on construction. The cost was still relatively high; Price had convinced the American Surety Company that all four facades needed to be decorated because of its high visibility. Price had conceived the building as a tower, which he saw as "the only artistic solution to the problem of high design". Although the American Surety Building was not entirely freestanding, being abutted by other structures, it had decorated facades on all four sides. Sometime during construction, the building's plans were modified so that it would have a 21st story. Price subsequently stated that he had planned to add a five-story pyramidal roof to his plans, similar to St Mark's Campanile in Venice. The campanile, as well as the progressively recessed windows, had been inspired by a failed plan for a structure opposite City Hall, which would have housed the New York Sun.

Work on the foundations began in early 1894 and was completed by that November. The foundation work took eight to nine months, representing about forty percent of the total time allocated for the building's construction. The design for the American Surety Building's cornice, which projected 5 feet (1.5 m) beyond the lot line, led to a lawsuit filed by John Jacob Astor, who owned the Schermerhorn Building immediately to the south and east. When Astor threatened to build a 22-story building in May 1896, shutting off the windows on these sides, the American Surety Company rented the Schermerhorn Building for 99 years at an annual cost of $75,000 (equivalent to $2,425,515 in 2024), which would be equivalent to paying 5% of the Schermerhorn Building's $1.5 million valuation each year. This allowed American Surety to construct its cornice as planned. The building was completed in 1896 at a cost of $1.75 million (equal to $57 million in 2024), of which 10% had been spent on underground work.

=== Early use and expansion ===
The North American Trust Company was one of the building's earlier tenants, having obtained quarters at the American Surety Building by 1898. Another early tenant was the Weather Bureau, which moved from its previous quarters at the Manhattan Life Building and installed a 100-foot-tall (30 m) steel pole atop the American Surety Building. As built, there was an air shaft between the American Surety and Schermerhorn buildings; this air shaft led to a fire in 1901 that damaged the Weather Bureau's quarters.

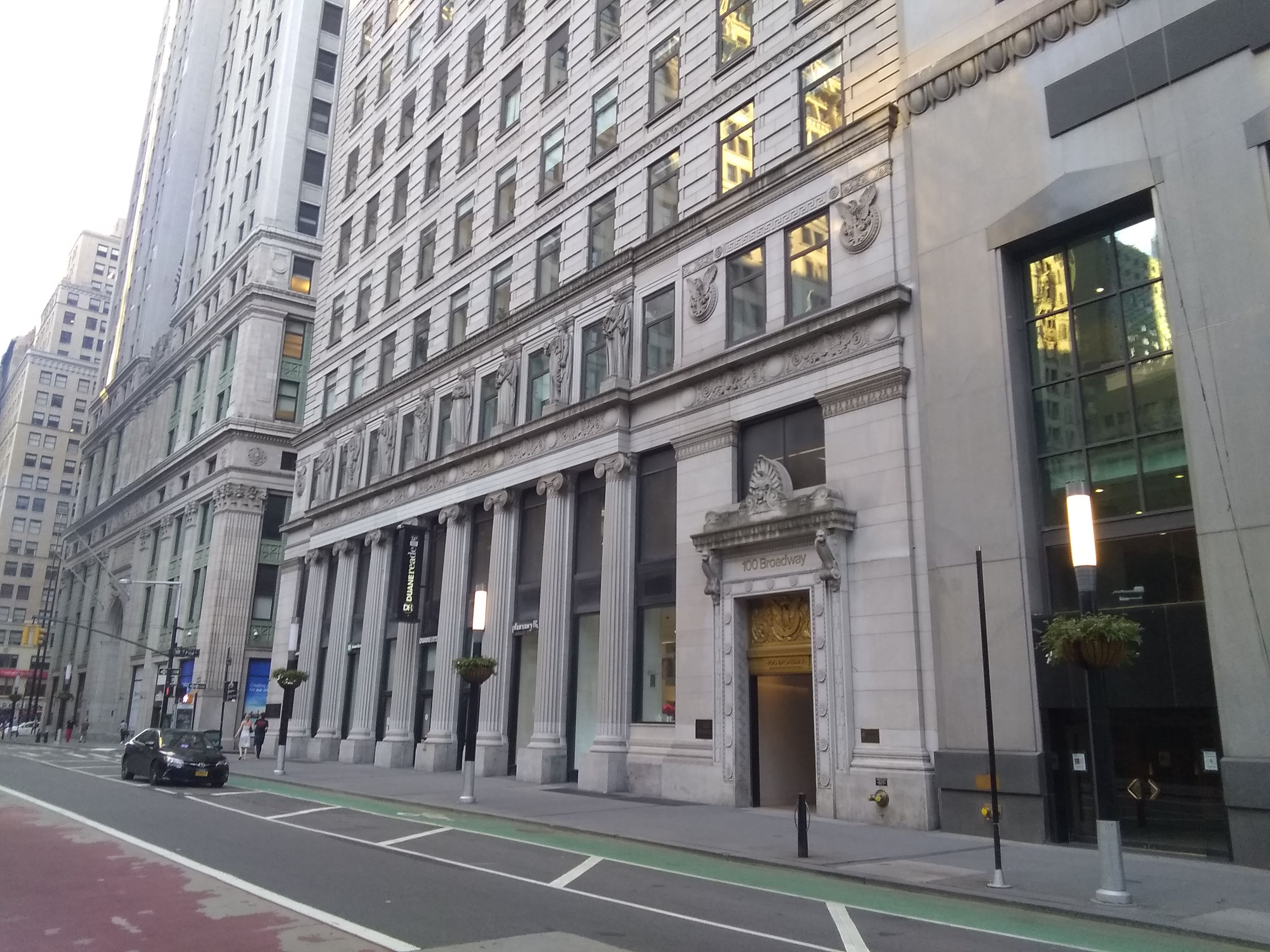
The base of the building seen from Broadway

In April 1920, the American Surety Company indicated its intention to acquire the Schermerhorn Building, and revealed plans for a $2.5 million annex to the American Surety Building (equivalent to $30 million in 2024) to be finished by 1921. The company then bought the Schermerhorn Building outright for $1.5 million, and started work on the annex by May 1920. Herman Lee Meader supervised alterations, while Ernest R. Graham was hired as consulting architect. The work included a new L-shaped annex that widened the building by 40 feet (12 m), the width of four bays, on both Pine Street and Broadway. Meader added a light shaft along the new southern elevation, but retained Price's original facade. The work also involved removing existing flooring and partitions, since the upper floors would have to be wider than the lower floors to align with the original building's walls, which receded gradually on each floor. The entrance portico on Broadway was shifted to the center of the facade; two figures on the 14th and 15th floors were removed; and a two-story penthouse was added. The New York Herald reported in July 1921 that the company had picked a leasing agent for the annex, and the work was completed the next year.

=== Later modifications ===
During the mid-20th century, one of the larger tenants was the Bank of Tokyo, which first took space in the American Surety Building in 1952 and expanded to the building's banking room and several floors over the next decade. Real estate investor Irving Brodsky bought the building in 1962, just after the American Surety Company merged with Transamerica Corporation.

The Thomson Realty Company took ownership of the building in 1973. When the bank's lease expired that year, it decided to sign a long-term lease and concurrently renovate the building. After the Bank of Tokyo signed its lease, the bank hired Kajima International to refurbish 100 Broadway's lowest thirteen stories, used by the Bank of Tokyo, for $11 million. Kajima installed new elevators, mechanical systems, and bronze windows. In addition, the ground-floor banking and commercial spaces were reconfigured into an open arcade, with the colonnade shielding a glass wall behind it. A sculpture by Isamu Noguchi, a 17-foot-long (5.2 m) aluminum rhomboid weighing 1,600 pounds (730 kg), was also placed in the lobby. This renovation was completed by 1975.

The Bank of Tokyo removed the Noguchi sculpture in 1980 without telling Noguchi. The same year, the New York Stock Exchange rented about 25,000 square feet (2,300 m^{2}) of offices at 100 Broadway, one block away from the New York Stock Exchange Building, where there was a shortage of space. During the early 1990s, the Bank of Tokyo vacated 150,000 square feet (14,000 m^{2}) of space it occupied at 100 Broadway, moving to 1251 Avenue of the Americas in Midtown Manhattan.

The New York City Landmarks Preservation Commission designated the building as a city landmark in 1995. After the September 11 attacks in 2001 led to the collapse of the World Trade Center nearby, the Borders replaced its destroyed World Trade Center branch with a 35,000-square-foot (3,300 m^{2}) bookstore in the American Surety Building's base, which opened in 2003. The project was praised as one of several commercial projects that contributed to economic growth in Lower Manhattan after the September 11 attacks. Madison Capital bought 100 Broadway in late 2010, and shortly afterward, the Borders branch closed after Borders Group filed for bankruptcy. Most of the vacant retail space was ultimately occupied in 2012 by Duane Reade, a pharmacy and convenience store. TD Ameritrade occupied the remaining retail space in 2013, and Northwood Investors bought the building the same year for $150 million.

== Critical reception ==
The American Surety Building was erected at a time when buildings usually did not rise higher than 10 or 11 stories, and when skyscrapers were generally criticized. Architecture critic Russell Sturgis praised the ground-floor colonnade in 1899 as "a masterly adaptation of the loveliest forms of antiquity" reinforced by the pilasters on Pine Street and Broadway. When Price died in 1903, The Brickbuilder described the American Surety Building as "certainly the most interesting tall building in the country". Architecture critic Montgomery Schuyler said in 1913 that the building design was one of the first to use "the column analogy" that became popular at the beginning of the 20th century. After the 1975 modernization project, critic Ada Louise Huxtable called 100 Broadway "one of those sleeper landmarks (undesignated) of which New York has so many more than anyone realizes—an outstandingly fine early skyscraper".

== See also ==
- List of New York City Designated Landmarks in Manhattan below 14th Street
