= Sterling Homestead =

Historic house in Connecticut, United States

- U.S. National Register of Historic Places
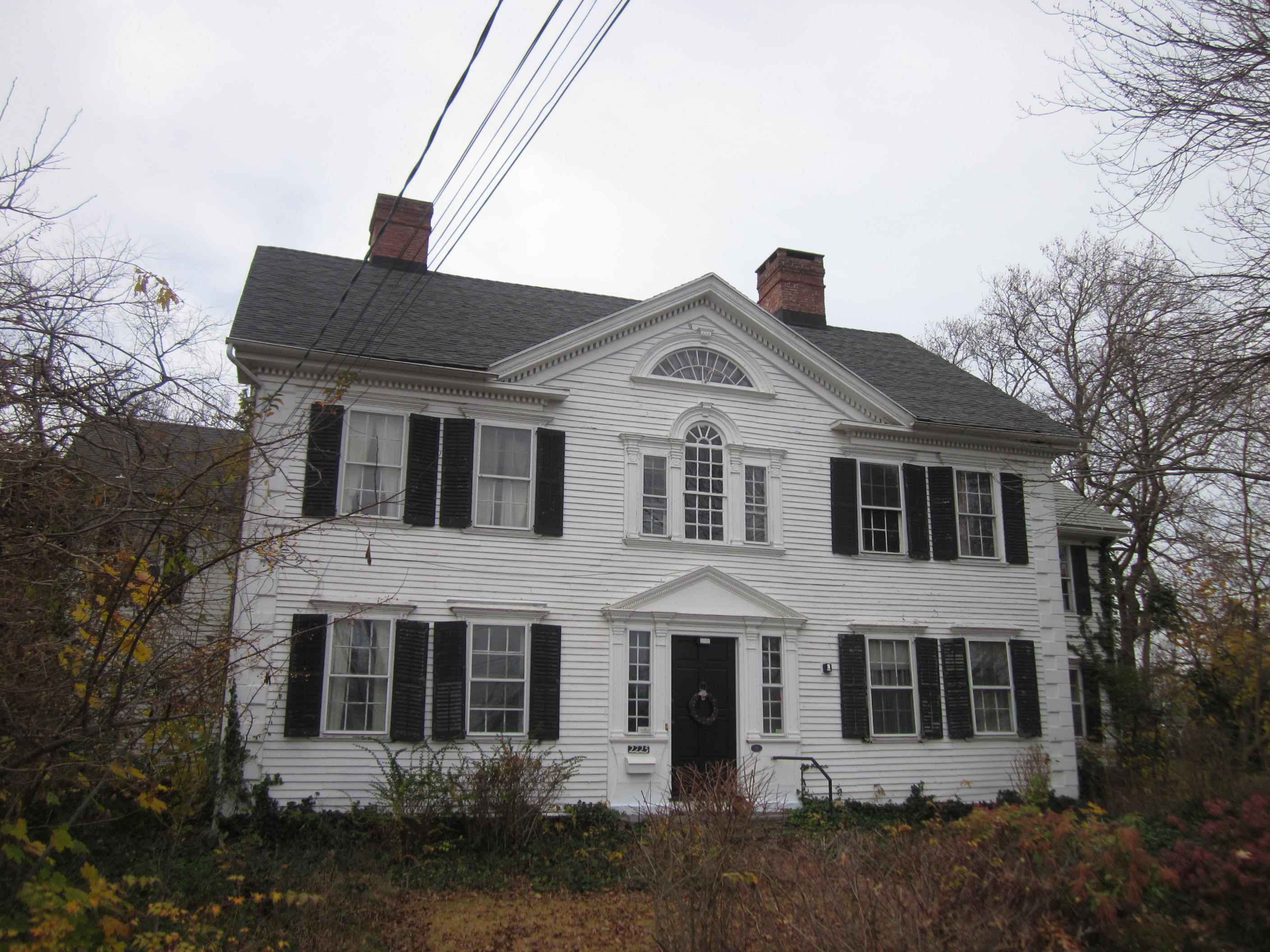

- Location within Connecticut Location within the United States
- Location: 2225 Main Street, Stratford, Connecticut
- Coordinates: 41°11′32″N 73°7′51″W
- Area: less than one acre
- Built: 1790
- Architectural style: Georgian, Federal
- NRHP reference No.: 76001973
- Added to NRHP: January 1, 1976

The Sterling Homestead is a historic house at 2225 Main Street in Stratford, Connecticut. It is a 2 1/2-story wood-frame structure, five bays wide, with a side-gable roof and two interior chimneys. A front-facing cross gable, decorated with a fan louver, stands centered above a Palladian window and the front entry, which is framed by sidelight windows and pilasters topped by an entablature. This house was probably built around 1790 for Abijah McEwen, and is most prominent for its association with John W. Sterling, a major local landowner and ship's captain engaged in the China trade, who purchased it in the mid-19th century. Sterling later built an elaborate mansion nearby, which now houses the Sterling House Community Center.

The house was listed on the National Register of Historic Places in 1976.

== See also ==
- National Register of Historic Places listings in Fairfield County, Connecticut
