= Bruce Price =

American architect (1845-1903)

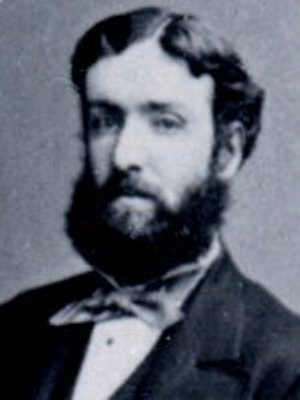
- Born: December 12, 1845; Cumberland, Maryland, United States
- Died: May 29, 1903 (aged 57); Paris, France
- Education: Princeton University
- Occupation: Architect
- Spouse: Josephine Lee
- Children: 2, including Emily Post

Bruce Price (December 12, 1845 – May 29, 1903) was an American architect and an innovator in the Shingle Style. The stark geometry and compact massing of his cottages in Tuxedo Park, New York, influenced Modernist architects, including Frank Lloyd Wright and Robert Venturi.

He also designed Richardsonian Romanesque institutional buildings, Beaux-Arts mansions, and Manhattan skyscrapers. In Canada, he designed Châteauesque railroad stations and grand hotels for the Canadian Pacific Railway, including Windsor Station in Montreal and Château Frontenac in Quebec City. He designed the original Banff Springs Hotel in 1888 but destroyed in a fire in 1926.

== Early life, family and education ==
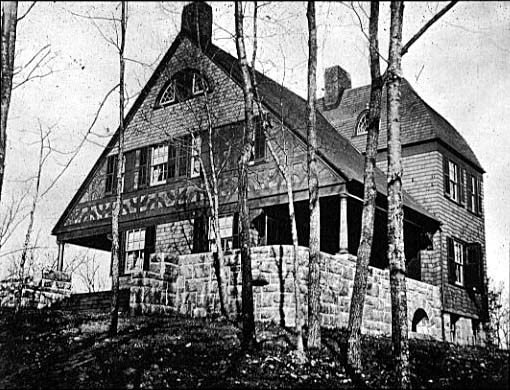
William Kent Cottage, Tuxedo Park, New York (1886, demolished).

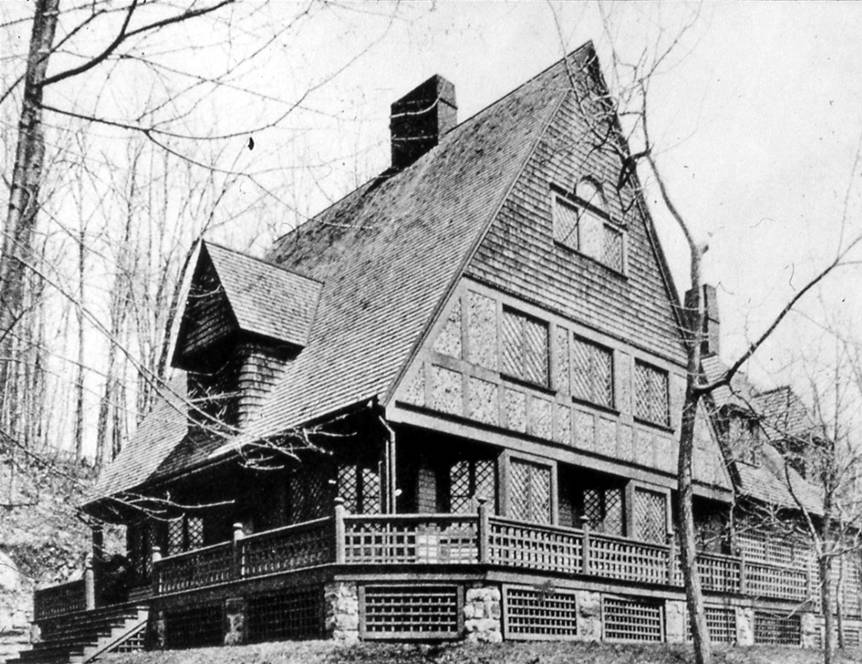
W. Chanler Cottage, Tuxedo Park, New York (1885–86, altered).

Frank Lloyd Wright may have modeled his Oak Park house and studio after these two cottages.

Price was born in Cumberland, Maryland, the son of William and Marian Bruce Price. He was first cousin (once removed) to Francis Scott Key. He studied for a short time at Princeton University. He trained for four years of internship with Baltimore architects Niernsee & Neilson (1864–68).

== Career ==
After his internship, Price began his professional work in Baltimore with Ephraim Francis Baldwin as a partner. Following a brief study trip to Europe, he opened an office in Wilkes-Barre, Pennsylvania, where he practiced from 1873 to 1876.

In 1876, he relocated to New York City, working on a series of domestic projects there. These culminated in the design and layout of the exclusive 7,000-acre planned community of Tuxedo Park (1885–86), created by Pierre Lorillard IV. The striking buildings Price designed there, with their severe geometry, compact massing and axial plans, were highly influential in the architectural profession. Eight of Price's houses – including five from Tuxedo Park – were among the one hundred buildings selected for George William Sheldon's landmark survey of American domestic architecture: Artistic Country-Seats (1886–87). (Note: McKim, Mead and White was the only firm to have more buildings listed in Sheldon.) The most famous of these, the Pierre Lorillard V cottage ("Cottage G"), though demolished and now known only through photographs, remains an icon of American architecture. Price's daughter wrote in 1911:

In beginning Tuxedo, the architect's idea was to fit buildings with the surrounding woods, and the gate-lodge and keep were built of graystone with as much moss and lichen as possible. The shingled cottages were stained with the color of the woods—russets and grays and dull reds—ugly to the taste of a quarter century later, though this treatment did much to neutralize the newness of the buildings—Old World and tradition-haunted as it looks, it is new, incredibly new.

Among the Manhattan office buildings he designed were the American Surety Building, the St. James Building, the Bank of the Metropolis and the International Bank. He also collaborated with sculptor Daniel Chester French on the Richard Morris Hunt Memorial (1898) in Central Park. He designed a lecture hall and a dormitory at Yale University. His grandest residential commission was Georgian Court, the neo-Georgian estate of George Jay Gould I in Lakewood, New Jersey.

Price invented, patented, and built the parlor bay-window cars for the Pennsylvania Railroad and the Boston and Albany Railroad. This work prompted the Canadian Pacific Railways to consider his portfolio. He designed the Château Frontenac in Quebec City for the Canadian Pacific (arguably the structure Price is most identified with), as well as the first Banff Springs Hotel in Alberta, and many other hotels and stations.

He was a Fellow of the American Institute of Architects (1890) and belonged to the Architectural League of New York. In 1900, he entered into a partnership with French architect Jules Henri de Sibour, who had earlier worked in his office. The firm continued to use the name "Bruce Price & de Sibour" until 1908, five years after Price's death.

== Personal life ==
In 1871, Price married Josephine Lee, the daughter of a Wilkes-Barre coal baron. They had two children: Emily (Price) Post, who became a novelist and the American authority on etiquette, and William, who died in infancy.

The family resided in Wilkes-Barre, Pennsylvania, then settled in New York City in 1877.

Price is buried, along with his wife and son, in Hollenback Cemetery in Wilkes-Barre, Pennsylvania.

== Honors and awards ==
In 2026, Price was announced as a posthumous inductee into the Luzerne County Arts & Entertainment Hall of Fame.

== Selected works ==
=== United States ===
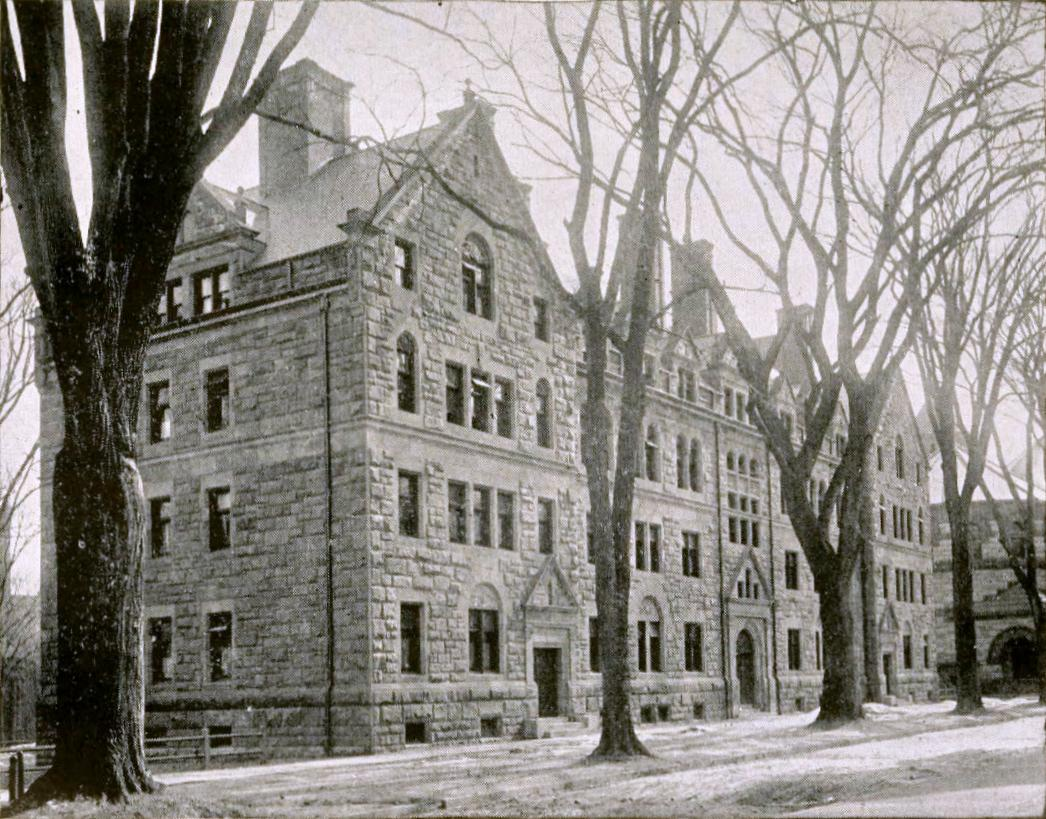
Welch Hall, Yale University, New Haven, Connecticut (1891)

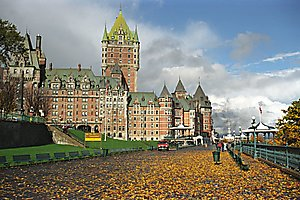
Château Frontenac, Quebec City, Quebec (1893)

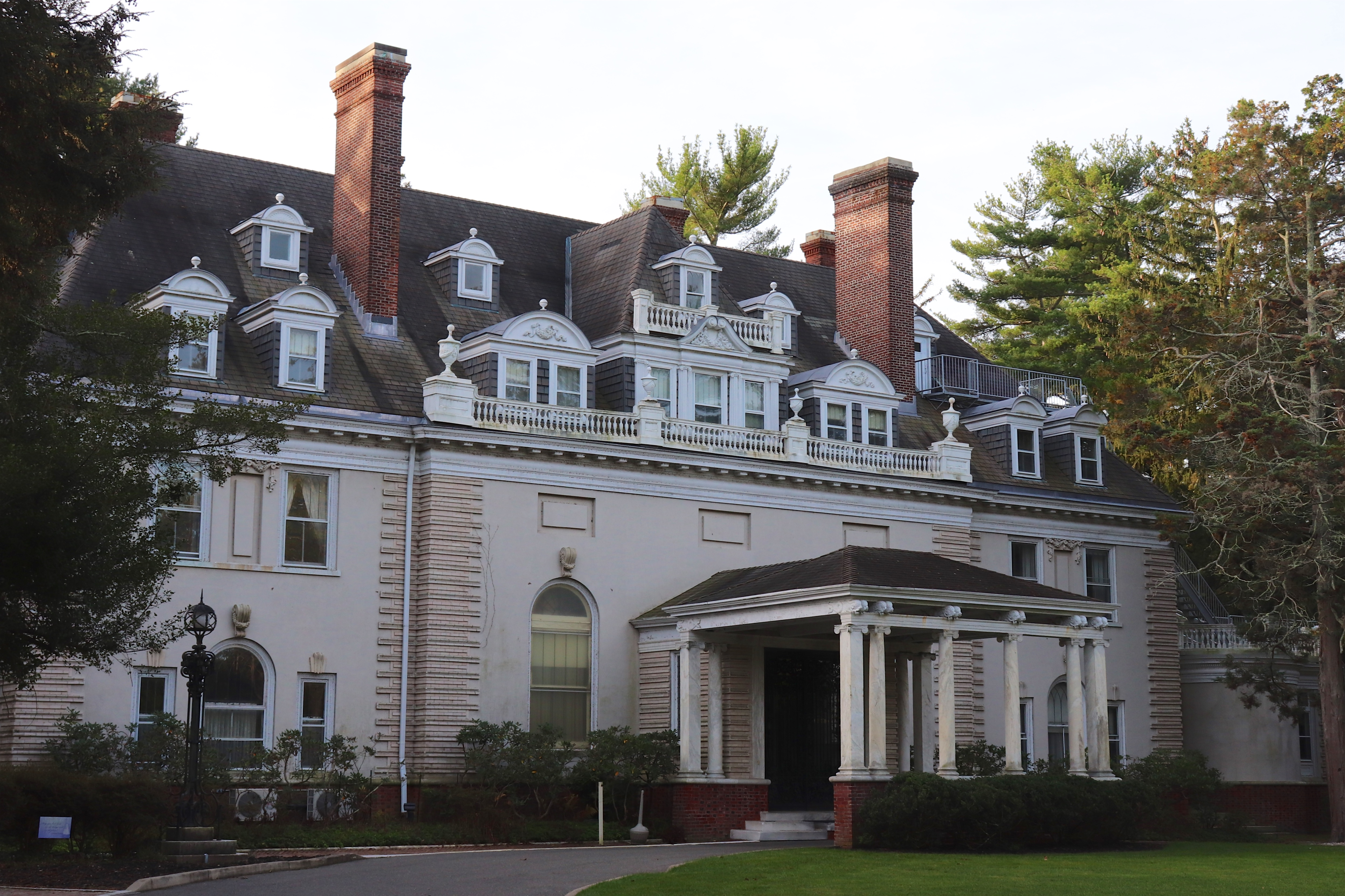
Gould Mansion, Georgian Court, Lakewood, New Jersey (1898)

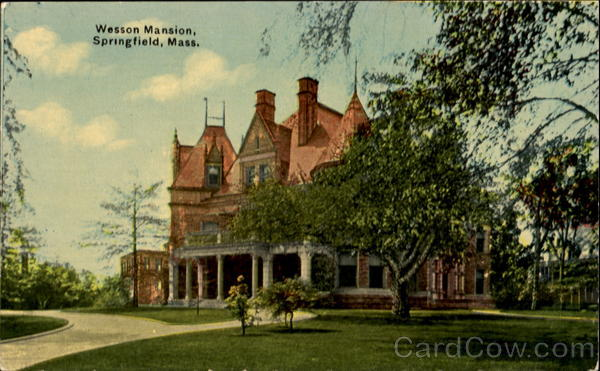
Daniel B. Wesson residence, Springfield, Massachusetts (1898)

Samuel Clemens at the Voss Cottage, Tuxedo Park, New York, Summer 1907

- 10 East Chase Street, Baltimore, Maryland (c. 1870)
- Coryell Apartment Building, 21 East 21st Street, Manhattan, New York (1878)
- James Alfred Roosevelt Estate, Cove Neck, New York (1881)
- "Cleftstone" (Charles T. How cottage), Bar Harbor, Maine (1881); now Cleftstone Manor Hotel
- "Seacroft", Rumson, New Jersey (1881)
- "Far Niente" (William B. Rice cottage), Bar Harbor, Maine (1882, demolished 1943)
- J. M. Wayne Neff residence, Cincinnati, Ohio (1882, demolished). Listed in Sheldon's Artistic Country-Seats (1886–87)
- "Seaverge" (George F. Baker residence), Monmouth Beach, New Jersey (c. 1884, demolished). Listed in Sheldon's Artistic Country-Seats (1886–87)
- Cordelia Sterling residence, Stratford, Connecticut (1886). Listed in Sheldon's Artistic Country-Seats (1886–87)
- Osborn Hall, Yale University, New Haven, Connecticut (1887–88, demolished 1926).
- Welch Hall, Yale University, New Haven, Connecticut (1891)
- Main Building, Hotchkiss School, Lakeville, Connecticut (1892, demolished 1970)
- Hotchkiss Library of Sharon, Sharon, Connecticut (1893)
- Elizabeth Train Station, Elizabeth, New Jersey (1893–94). Built as Central Railroad of New Jersey Depot
- American Surety Building, 100 Broadway, Manhattan, New York City (1894, altered). Architect Herman Lee Meader widened the building and added additional stories in 1922.
- "The Turrets" (John J. Emery house), Bar Harbor, Maine (1895); now part of College of the Atlantic
- St. James Building, 1133 Broadway, Manhattan, New York (1896)
- George Jay Gould Mansion, Lakewood, New Jersey (1898); now part of Georgian Court University
- Richard Morris Hunt Memorial, Fifth Avenue between 70th & 71st Streets, Central Park, Manhattan, New York City (1898), with sculptor Daniel Chester French.
- Daniel B. Wesson residence, Springfield, Massachusetts (1898, destroyed by fire 1966).
- Old Washington County Library, Hagerstown, Maryland (1900).
- Whittier Hall Dormitories, Teachers College, Columbia University, Manhattan, New York City (1901), with J. M. Darragh
- Hendrick Hudson Hotel, Yonkers, New York (1901)
- Audrain Building, 220-30 Bellevue Avenue, Newport, Rhode Island (1902)
- Bank of the Metropolis, 31 Union Square West, Manhattan, New York City (1902–03)
- Northfield Chateau, Northfield, Massachusetts (1903, demolished 1963)

==== Tuxedo Park, New York ====
- Tuxedo Park Post Office (1885)
- Gate-Lodge and Keep (1885–86)
- Erie Railroad Tuxedo Park Station (1885)
- "Cottage G" (Pierre Lorillard V Cottage) (1885–86, demolished). Listed in Sheldon's Artistic Country-Seats (1886–87).
- William Kent Cottage (1885–86, demolished). Listed in Sheldon's Artistic Country-Seats (1886–87). Vincent Scully argues that Frank Lloyd Wright modeled his Oak Park house and studio after this and the Chanler cottage.
- W. Chanler Cottage (1885–86, altered). Scully identifies the client as "W. Chandler," but it was likely Winthrop Astor Chanler.
- The Tuxedo Club (1886, demolished 1927)
- Pierre Lorillard IV Cottage (1886, altered). Listed in Sheldon's Artistic Country-Seats (1886–87).
- Henry I. Barbey Cottage (1886, demolished). Listed in Sheldon's Artistic Country-Seats (1886–87).
- Travis Van Buren Cottage, Tower Hill Road (1886, altered beyond recognition). Listed in Sheldon's Artistic Country-Seats (1886–87).
- Francis D. Carley Cottage, West Lake Road (1886, moved from original site 1896)
- Tuxedo Park School (first building) (c. 1887, demolished)
- M. G. Barnwell Stable, Clubhouse Road (1889–90)
- Meta K. Cruger Cottage, Tower Hill Road (c. 1890)
- Japanese Cottage, 16 Summit Road (1891)
- Our Lady of Mount Carmel Roman Catholic Church, Route 17 (1895, burned 1897)
- Bruce Price Cottage, Pepperidge Road, Tuxedo Park (1897).
- Voss Cottage, Pepperidge Road (c. 1897). One of four cottages Price built for rental. Samuel Clemens rented it in 1907.
- Emily Post cottage (c. 1897). One of four cottages Price built for rental. His daughter Emily (Price) Post inherited it.
- Addison Cammack House (1900)
- Price Collier House, West Lake Road (1900)
- Tuxedo Park Association Offices, Route 17 (1900)
- Tuxedo Stores (Business Block), Route 17 (c. 1900)
- Tuxedo Park Library, 227 Route 17 (1901)
- Methodist Episcopal Church, 7 Hospital Road (1902); now Tuxedo Historical Society
- R. M. Gillespie House (1903)

=== Canada ===
- Windsor Station, Montreal, Quebec (1887–89)
- Banff Springs Hotel, Banff National Park, Alberta (1888, demolished 1925). Price's wood-and-shingle hotel was replaced by one of stone and concrete.
- James Ross House, Montreal, Quebec (1892); now known as Old Chancellor Day Hall at the McGill University Faculty of Law
- Château Frontenac, Quebec City, Quebec (1893)
- Place Viger, Montreal, Quebec (1897). A combined railroad station and hotel.

== Gallery ==
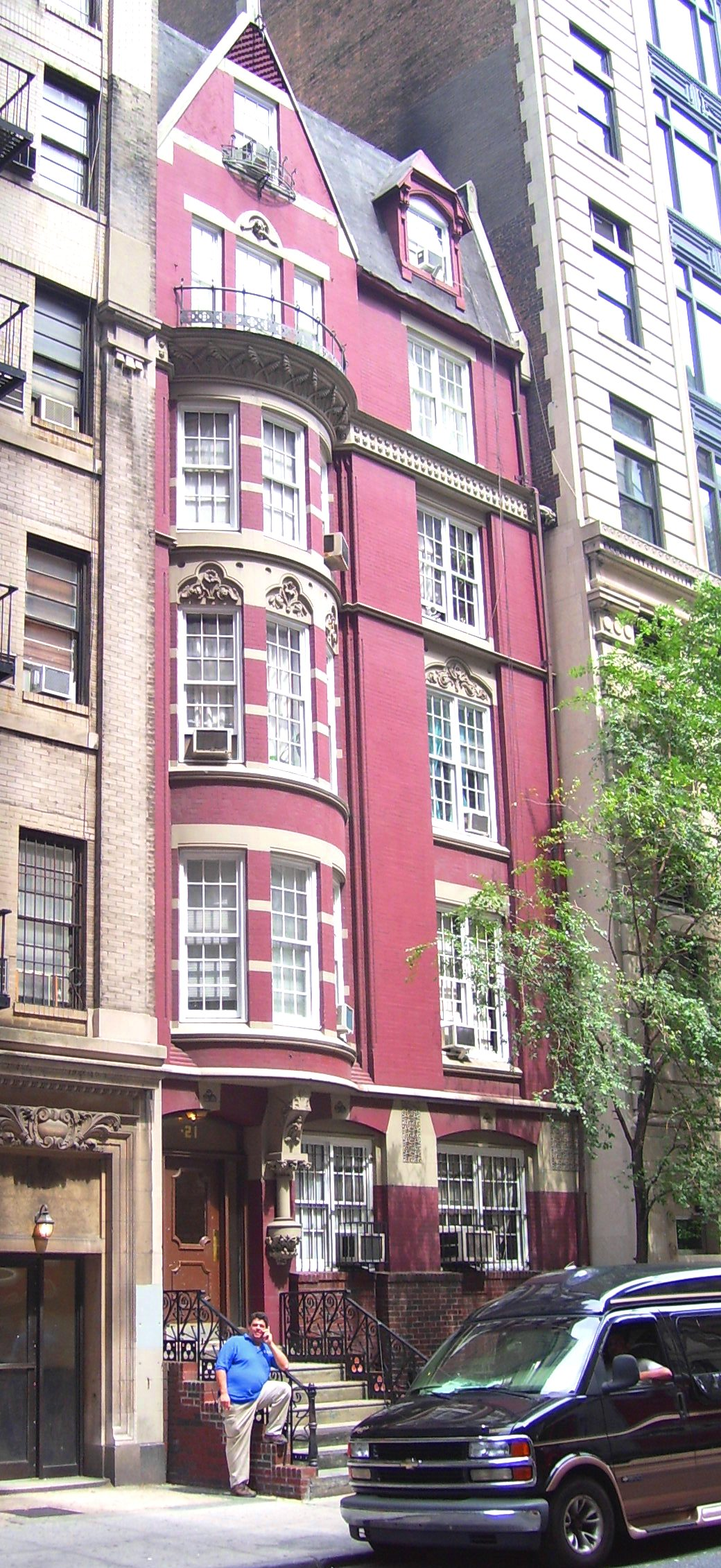
Coryell Apartment Building, 21 East 21st Street, Manhattan, New York (completed 1878)

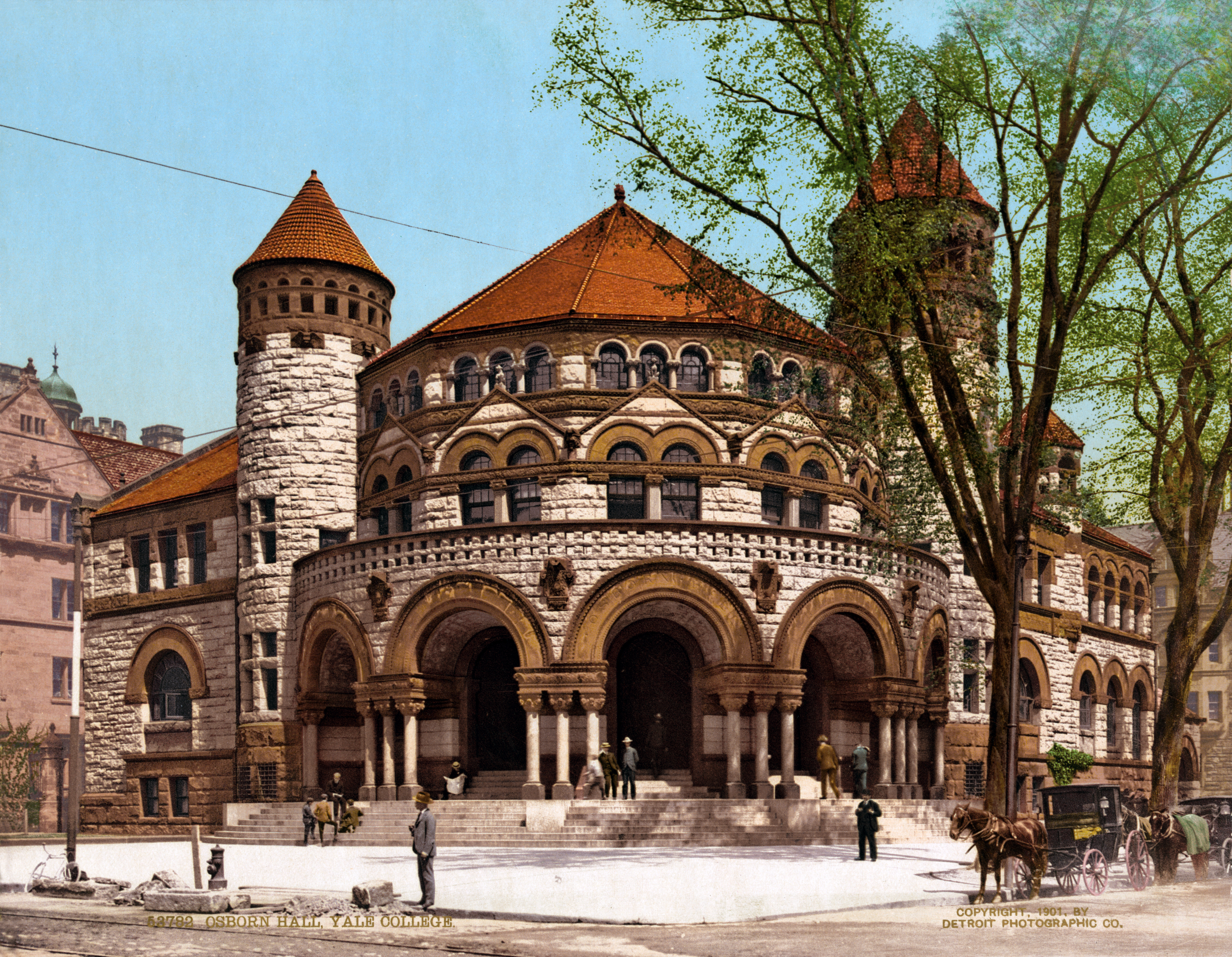
Osborn Hall, Yale University, New Haven, Connecticut (built 1887–88; demolished 1926)

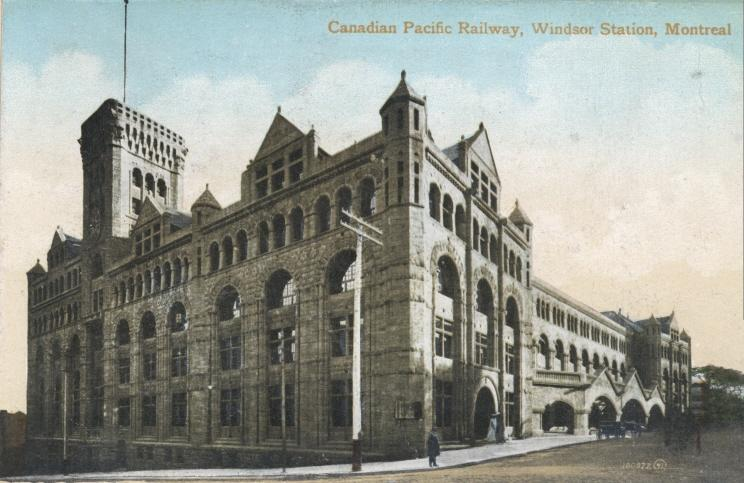
Windsor Station, Montreal, Quebec (built 1887–89)

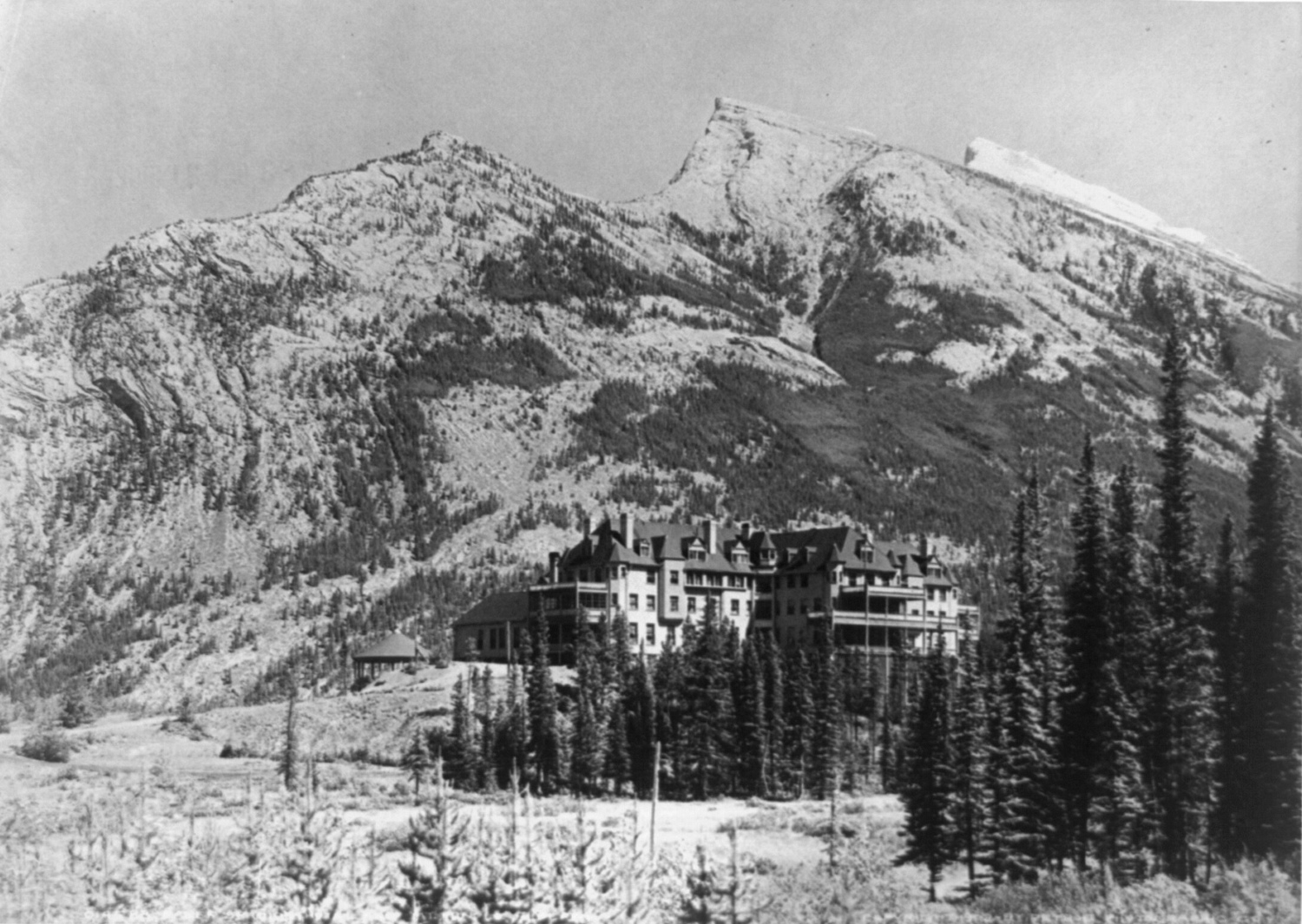
Banff Springs Hotel, Banff National Park, Alberta (completed 1888; demolished 1925)

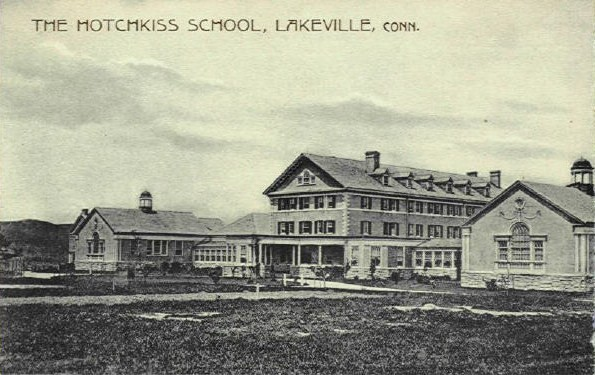
Main Building, Hotchkiss School, Lakeville, Connecticut (completed 1892; demolished 1970)

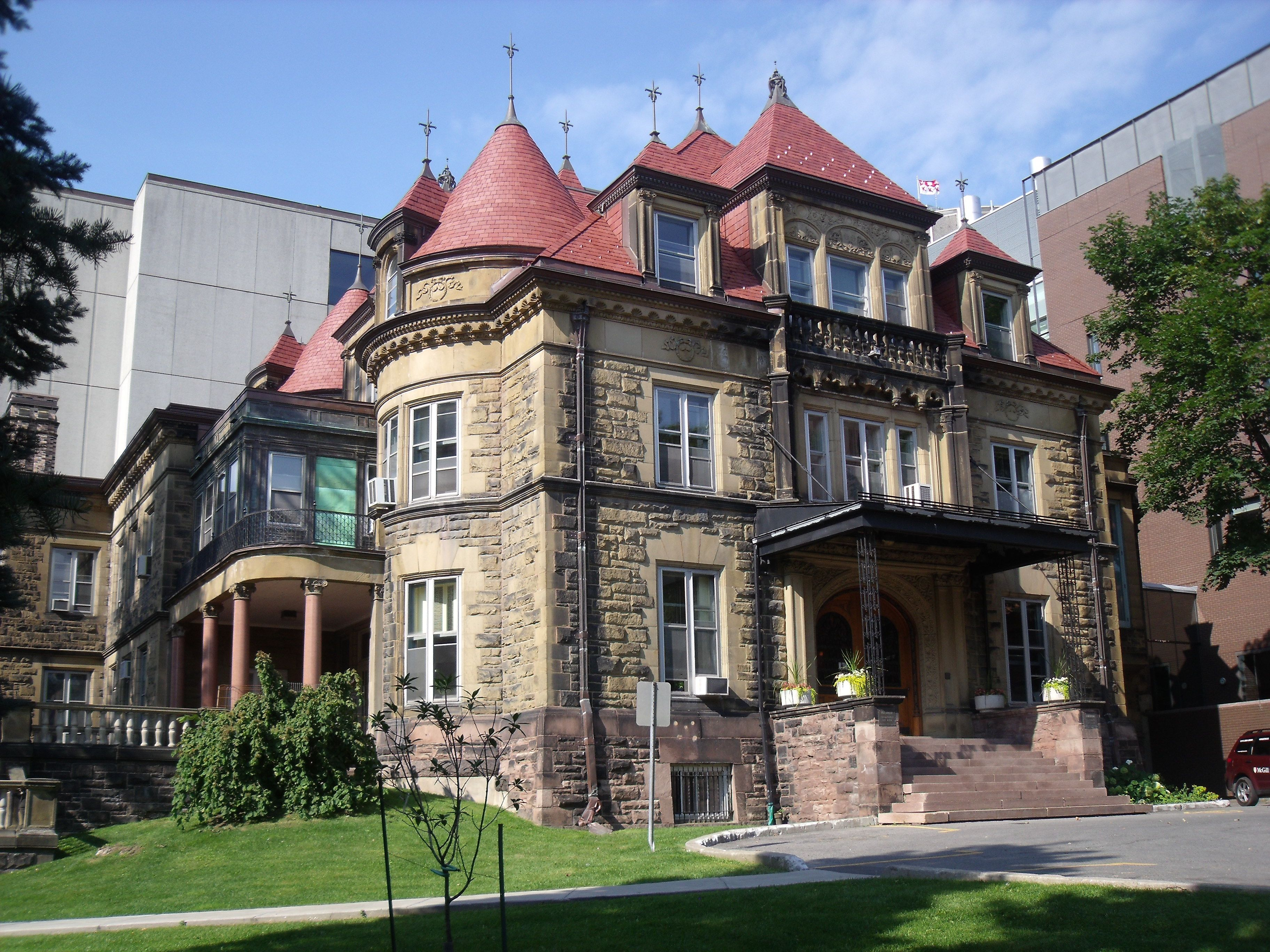
James Ross House, Montreal, Quebec (completed 1892)

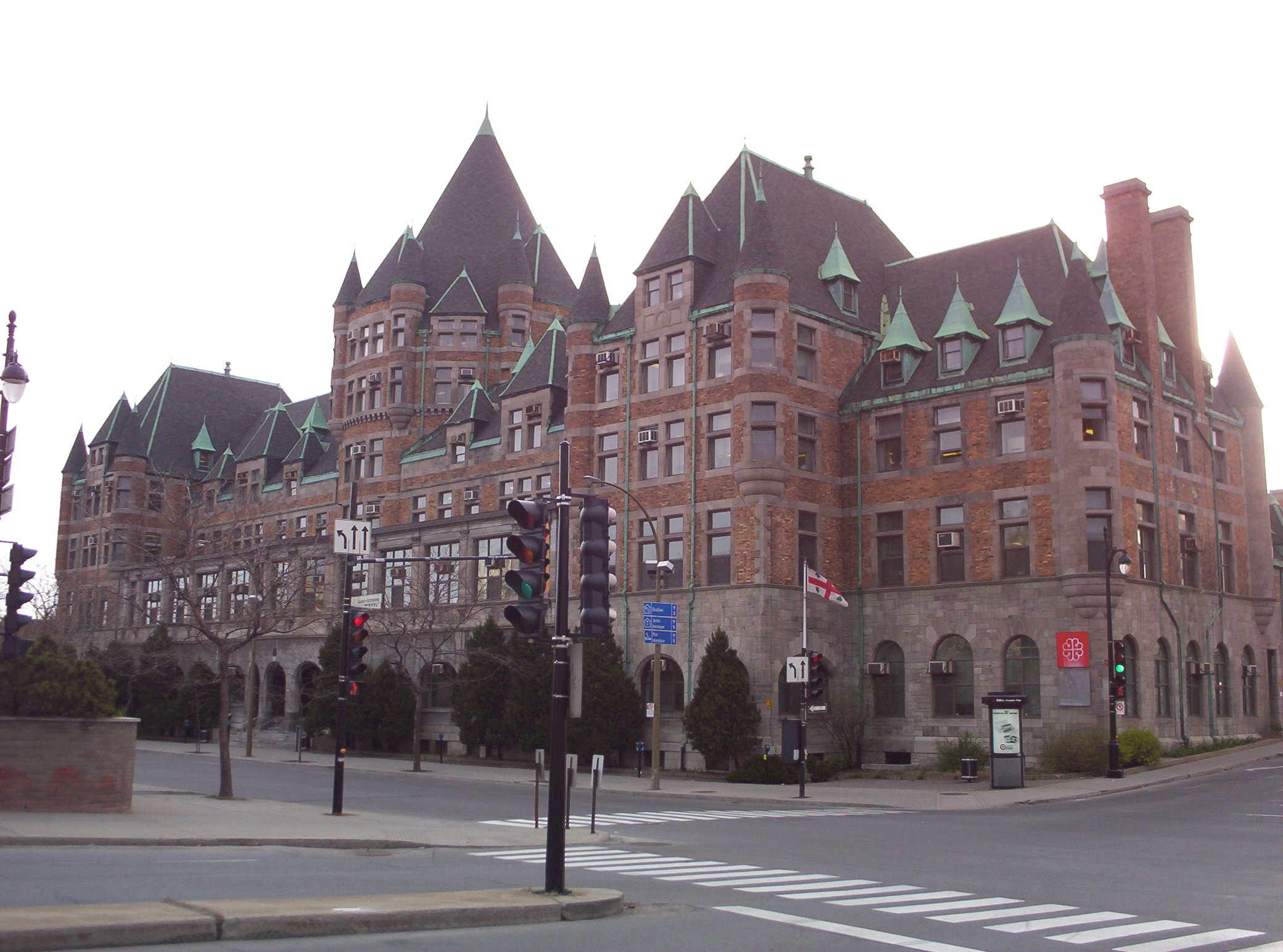
Place Viger, Montreal, Quebec (completed 1897)

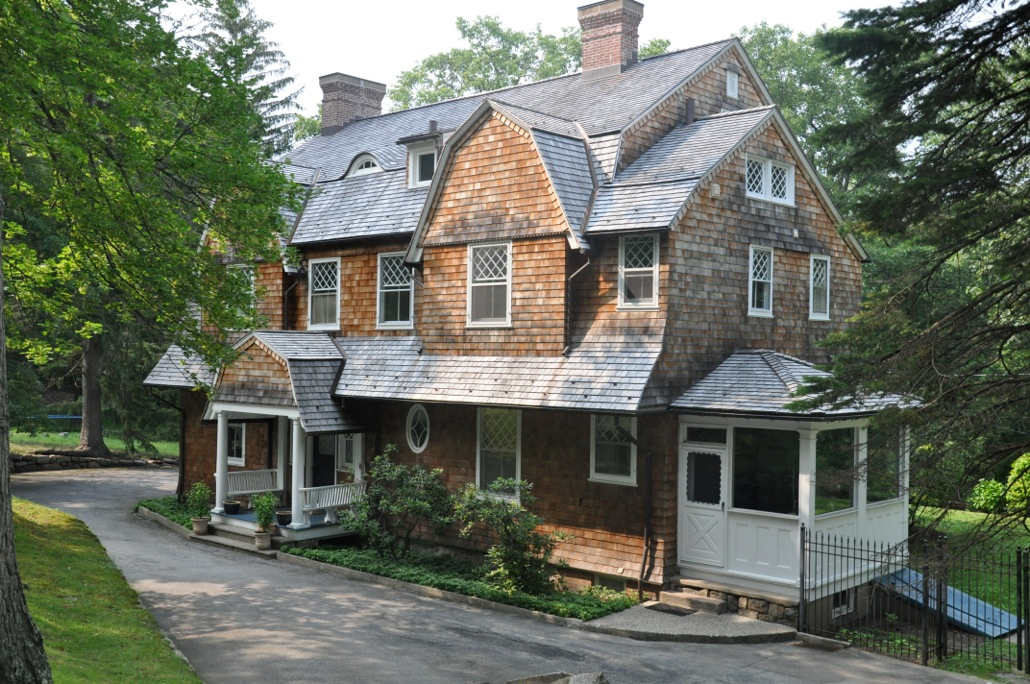
Bruce Price Cottage, Tuxedo Park, New York (completed 1897)

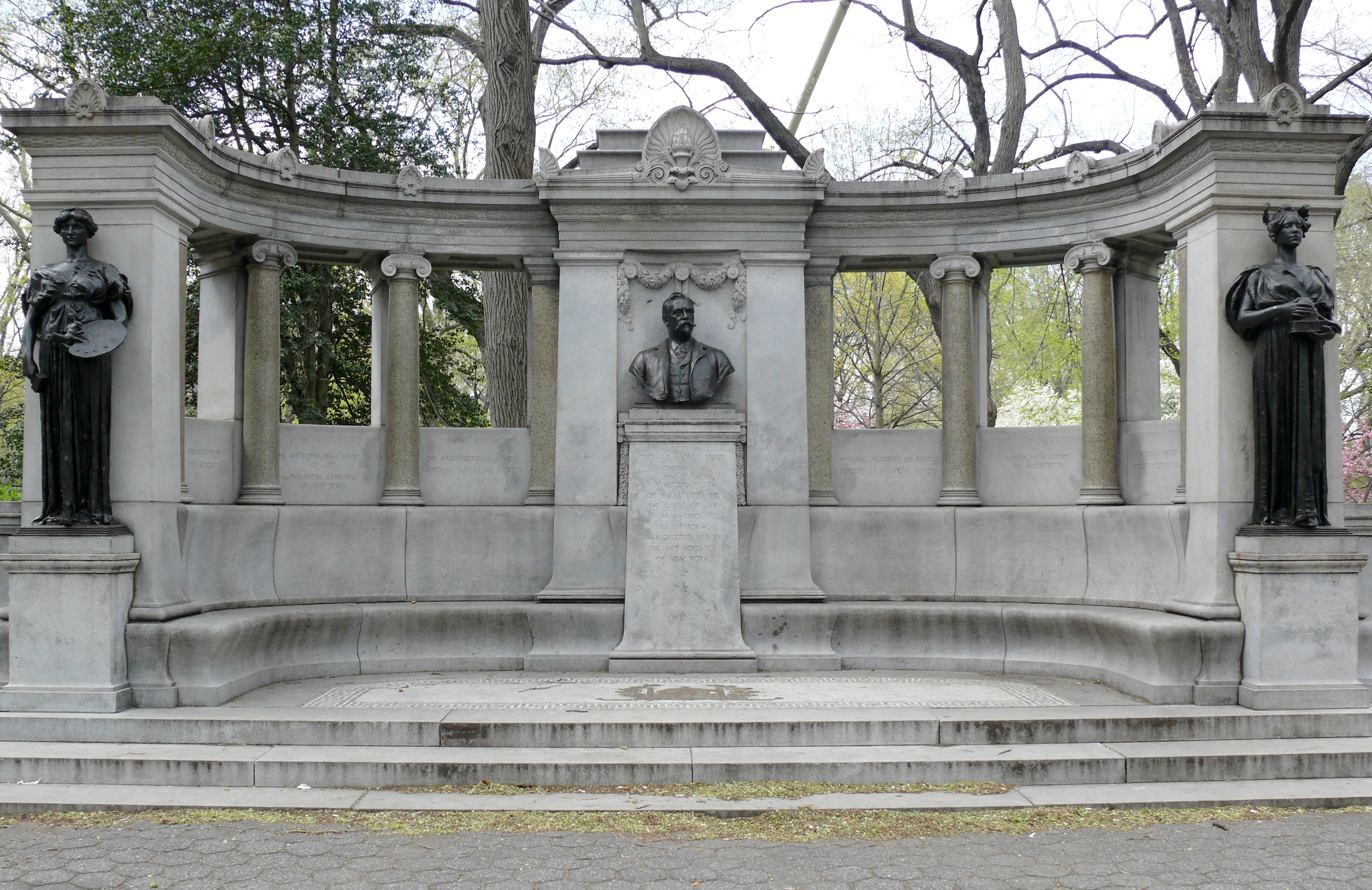
Richard Morris Hunt Memorial, Central Park, New York City (completed 1898), with sculptor Daniel Chester French

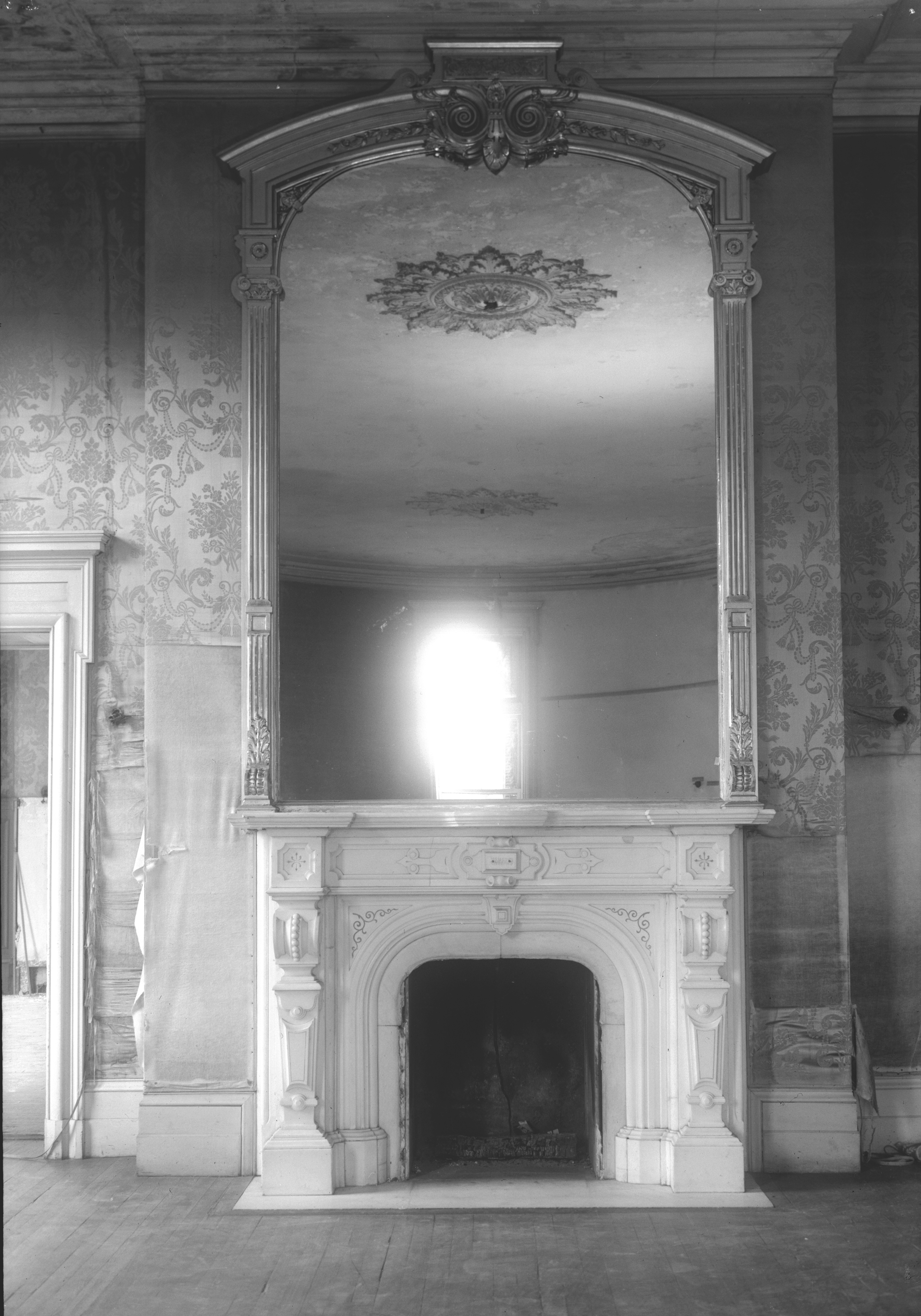
Salon fireplace, Northfield Chateau, Northfield, Massachusetts (completed 1903; demolished 1963)

== See also ==
- Canada's railway hotels
- Canadian Pacific hotels
- Canadian Pacific Railway
