= Bruce Price Cottage =

Historic house in New York, United States

- U.S. Historic district – Contributing property
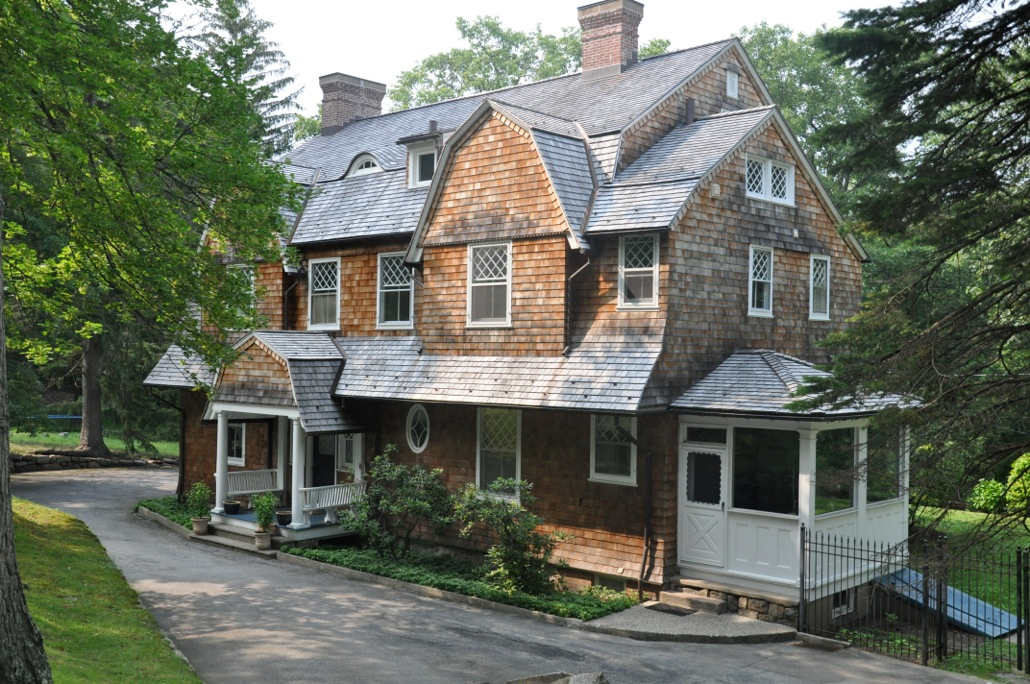
- Location: 18 Pepperidge Rd., Tuxedo Park, New York
- Built: 1897
- Architect: Bruce Price
- Architectural style: Dutch Colonial
- Part of: Tuxedo Park (ID80002740)

Bruce Price Cottage is one of four "cottages" constructed by Bruce Price on Pepperidge Road in Tuxedo Park, New York. Price was the founding architect of the Tuxedo Park estate, where he designed and built a number of the large mansions. Bruce Price Cottage and other constructions in Tuxedo Park were highly influential on the style of Frank Lloyd Wright and other, younger architects.

He constructed the cottage for his wife, Josephine Lee, in 1897. He also constructed Emily Post cottage for their daughter who spent her childhood there. Regular visitors to the house at the time included Pierre Lorillard and William Astor.

Bruce Price Cottage is built in Dutch Colonial Revival style. All four cottages were inherited by Emily. In 1920 she divided the property.

Notable people who have lived in the Bruce Price Cottages include Edwin and Emily Post, Guy and Lory Spier, Robert Norden, and Sutton Foster.
