= Sterling House =

Community center located in Stratford, Connecticut

Coordinates: 41.1923°N 73.1307°W

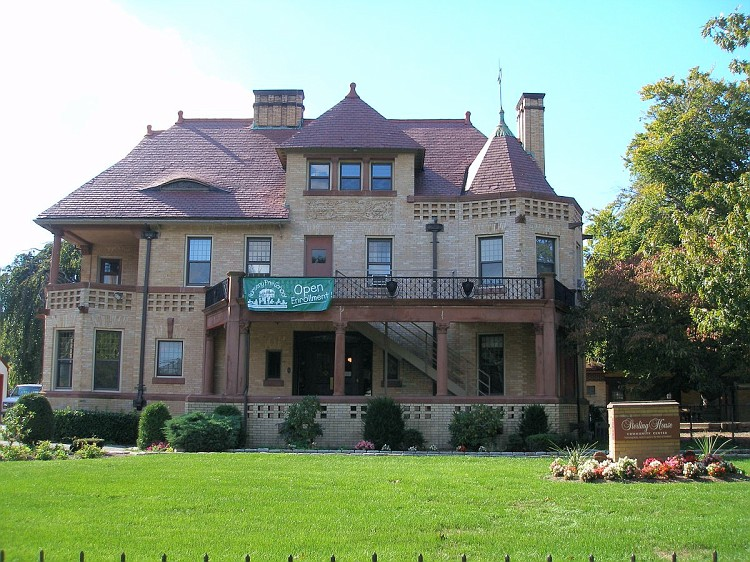

Sterling Community Center is a community center at 2283 Main Street in Stratford, Connecticut, United States. It is located in a mansion that was built by John William Sterling in 1886. Sterling House is a Romanesque mansion on the property. In its early days it was the home of the Sterling family. The mansion was designed by architect Bruce Price of New York, who also designed Osborne Hall and Welch Hall at Yale University. Sterling's daughter, Cordelia, donated the house and its surrounding estate to the town as a park upon her death in 1931. Since 1932, Sterling House has been known as Sterling House Community Center. The community center features a variety of programs and events and hosts functions including the Arts Alliance of Stratford, public service programs for Stratford's community, and an array of community programs including addiction support programs such as Alcoholics Anonymous, and others.

The house is a contributing element in the Stratford Center Historic District.
