= Ernest Fiene =

American artist (1894–1965)

- Born: Ernest Fiene; November 2, 1894; Elberfeld, German Empire
- Died: August 10, 1965 (aged 70); Paris, France
- Known for: Printmaker

Ernest Fiene (November 2, 1894 – August 10, 1965) was a 20th-century American graphic artist who primarily worked in New York City and Woodstock, New York. Fiene was known primarily for his varied printed works, including lithographs and etchings. His notable work includes cityscapes, views of New York City in particular, landscapes and other figural art.

== Biography ==
"Winter Roundup", by Ernest Fiene at the Department of Interior, Washington, D.C, 1938.

Ernest Fiene was born in Elberfeld, Germany on November 2, 1894 to Henry and Maria Fiene. He left Germany in 1912. Traveling first to the Netherlands, he continued on to the United States.

From 1914 to 1918 he studied at the National Academy of Design in New York City, and from 1916 to 1918 at the Beaux Arts Institute. In 1923, Fiene continued his study of printmaking at the Art Students League of New York. In 1921 he married Jeannette Etarre. In 1923, he had his first solo show at the Whitney Studio Club. The show was successful, and he secured an art dealer. His work was decidedly modern, depicting modern life and industry through color and shape through precisionism.

From 1928 to 1929 Fiene studied in Paris and traveled in France. In 1932, he was awarded a Guggenheim Fellowship which allowed him to study mural painting in Italy. His work was sold as lithographs through the Associated American Artists' (AAA) mail-order catalogs for $5 each. Through his association with AAA, Fiene was hired in 1940, along with eight other prominent American artists, to document dramatic scenes and characters during the production of the film The Long Voyage Home, a cinematic adaptation of Eugene O'Neill's plays. His work was part of the painting event in the art competition at the 1932 Summer Olympics.

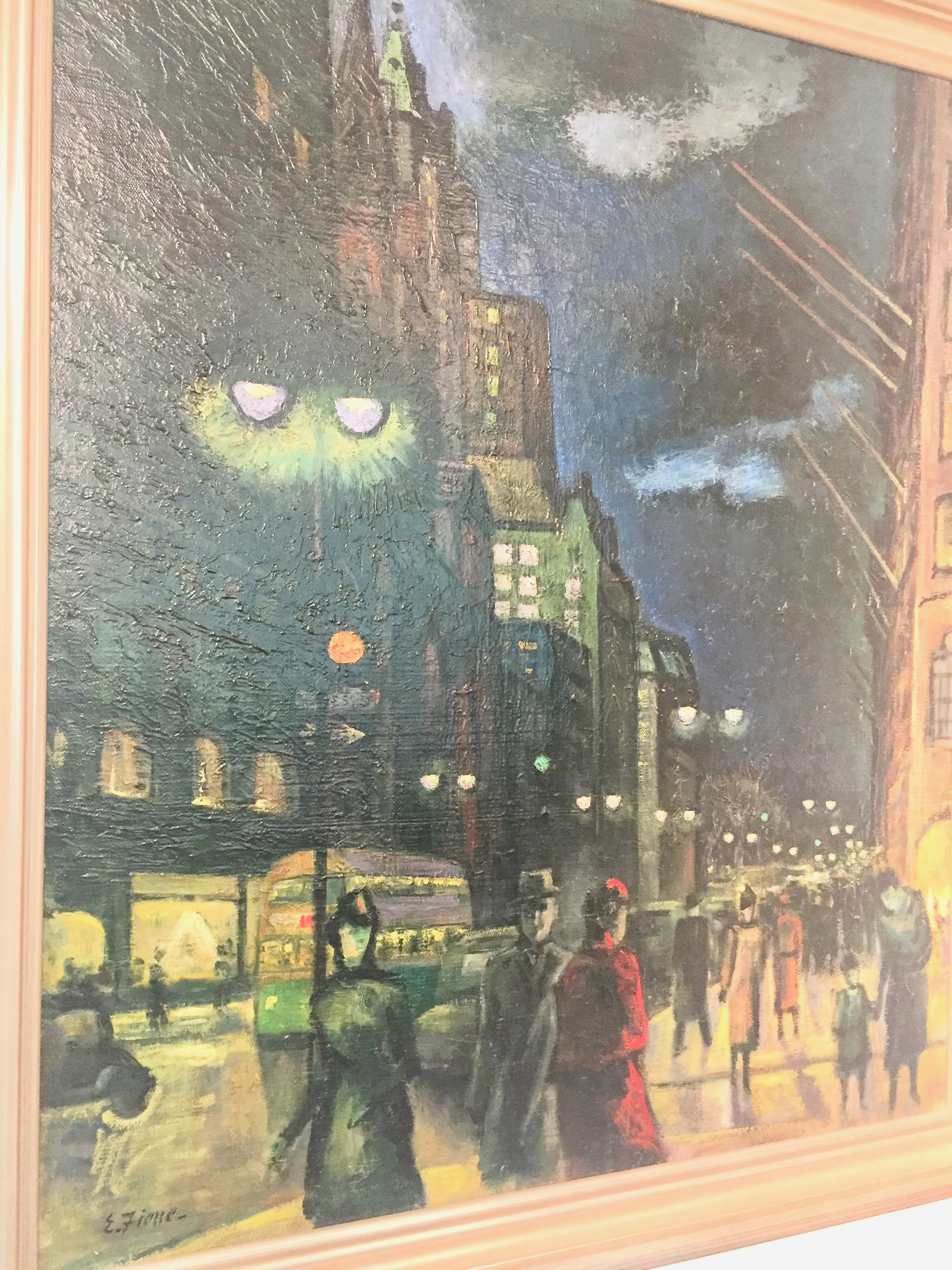
Fifth Avenue and West 54th Street at Night by Ernest Fiene.

In 1945 he divorced his first wife and married Alicia Wiencek (1918–1961) on August 13, 1945, who was one of his students at the Arts Students League. Fiene re-established his relationship with the Art Students League in 1948, returning to teach classes in painting and drawing there. In 1948, he was elected into the National Academy of Design as an Associate member, and became a full Academician in 1952. In the 1950s he also served on the faculty of the Famous Artists School in Westport, Connecticut.

Fiene died of a heart attack in Paris in 1965.
