= The Turrets =

Historic house in Maine, United States

- U.S. National Register of Historic Places
- Location within Maine Location within the United States
- Location: Eden St., Bar Harbor, Maine
- Coordinates: 44°23′41″N 68°13′13″W
- Area: 5 acres (2.0 ha)
- Built: 1895
- Architect: Bruce Price
- Architectural style: Renaissance, Chateauesque
- NRHP reference No.: 74000155
- Added to NRHP: December 24, 1974

The Turrets is a historic summer estate house on Eden Street in Bar Harbor, Maine. Designed by New York City architect Bruce Price and built in 1895, the French Chateau-style building was one of the most elaborate built in Bar Harbor during its heyday as a summer resort. It is now part of the campus of the College of the Atlantic, and was listed on the National Register of Historic Places in 1974.

== Description and history ==
The Turrets is located on the shore of Frenchman Bay on the campus of the College of the Atlantic, northwest of Bar Harbor's central business district. It is a large three-to-four story granite building, with a complex roof line that includes many projections, turrets, and dormers. The front facade faces west, away from the water, and is roughly divided into five sections. The central section, four stories in height, has a porte-cochere in front, supported by Ionic columns, with a heavy turned balustrade. The second floor has a group of three windows, topped by arched panels with fleur-de-lis, and the third also has three windows, divided by Ionic columns. The fourth floor is a mansard-style roof with a dormer. To the left of the central section are a three-story wing and a two-story kitchen wing, between which stands a secondary entrance that has a masonry portico topped by a turret. To the right of the central section stands a three-story round tower with a conical cap, beyond which is a three-story wing with a rounded corner. The interior of the house includes a grand staircase and a paneled dining room.

John J. Emery, a wealthy Cincinnati businessman, commissioned the construction of The Turrets, which was completed in 1895. It joined a number of elegant summer houses that lined Bar Harbor's coast, many of which were destroyed in a devastating fire in 1947. The Turrets stood vacant for many years before its acquisition by the College of the Atlantic in the 1970s.

== See also ==
- National Register of Historic Places listings in Hancock County, Maine
