= Alicia Wiencek Fiene =

American artist (1918–1961)

- Born: Alicia Wiencek; April 23, 1918 April 23, 1918; Chicopee, Massachusetts
- Died: February 17, 1961 (aged 42); New York City
- Known for: muralist
- Spouse: Ernest Fiene

Alicia Wiencek Fiene (1918–1961) was an American painter. She is best known for her New Deal era mural in the Mooresville, North Carolina Post Office.

== Biography ==
Fiene née Wiencek was born on April 23, 1918, in Chicopee, Massachusetts. She studied at the Art Students League of New York and the Colorado Springs Fine Arts Center. In 1945 she married her professor Ernest Fiene with whom she had two children. Prior to their marriage the couple worked together on Fiene's fresco murals for the Central High School of Needle Trades.

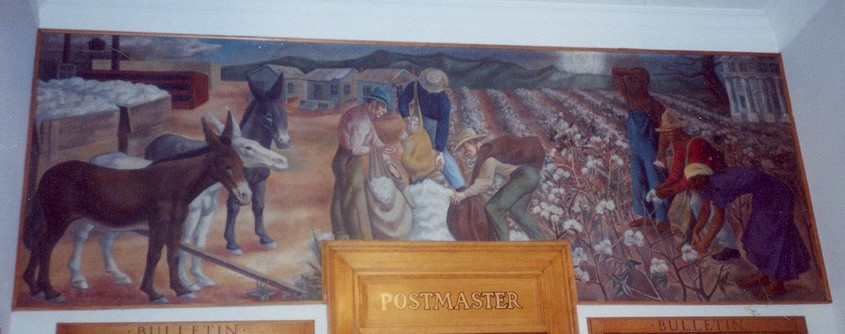
"North Carolina Cotton Industry", 1937

In 1937 Wiencek painted the mural North Carolina Cotton Industry for the Mooresville, North Carolina Post Office. The mural was funded by the Treasury Section of Fine Arts (TSFA). Wiencek's work is in the collection of the Detroit Institute of Arts.

She died in New York City on February 17, 1961.
