= Welch Hall (Yale University) =

Coordinates: 41.30803°N 72.92853°W

Harmanus Welch Hall is a freshman dormitory at Yale University in New Haven, Connecticut, United States. The building is located on Yale University's Old Campus. Pierce N. Welch, an 1862 graduate of Yale College, Mrs. Cora Van Milligan, and Mrs. Grace M. Davies, heirs of Harmanus M. Welch, mayor of New Haven from 1860 to 1863, donated the building to Yale in 1891 in accordance with their father's wishes. The architect Bruce Price designed the building.

Welch Hall viewed from Old Campus, early winter 2006.

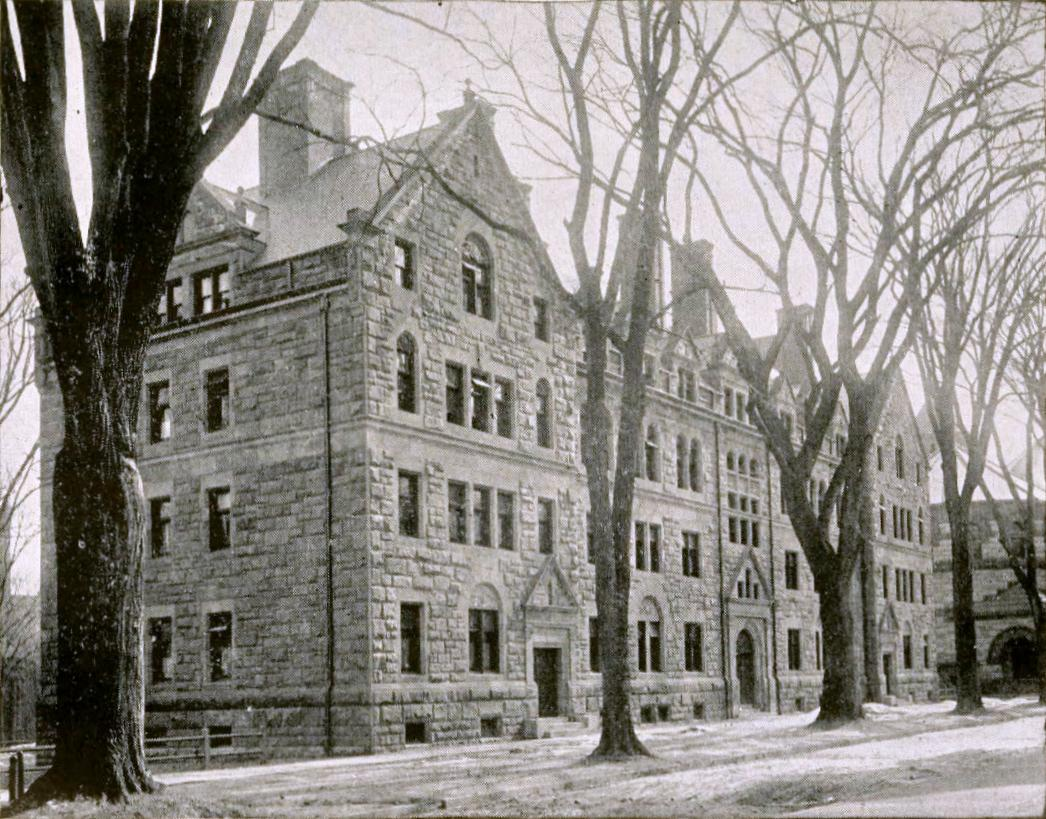
Welch Hall circa 1895. From Yale Yarns: Sketches of Life at Yale University by John Seymour Wood. (New York: The Knickerbocker Press, 1895.)

Welch Hall faces College Street and the New Haven Green on one side and the interior of Yale's Old Campus on the other. Carved above the first-floor windows at both ends of the College Street façade is the inscription AD 1891. The dormitory is Victorian English Collegiate in style and built of Longmeadow freestone. The building has been altered and renovated several times. The first floor, converted in 1938 for the Office of Admissions and the Freshman Year, was restored to use as a dormitory in 1962 and 1964. In 1976, the building underwent a major renovation led by architect Herbert S. Newman and funded by John Hay Whitney, a 1926 graduate of Yale College.

Welch Hall is currently occupied by Ezra Stiles College freshmen. It is considered among Yale students to be one of the more desirable freshman residence halls because it has many single bedrooms, large common rooms, and internal emergency exit doors without alarms, allowing residents to move freely between different parts of the building without having to go outside or through the basement. On the building's first floor are two suites, nicknamed the "10-pack" and the "12-pack," that are two of Yale's largest freshmen suites. On the building's fourth and fifth floors are the coveted "Princess Suites," which feature two-story common areas, skylights, and spacious bedrooms.
