= Harold Egan =

Australian rules footballer

Personal information
- Full name: Harold Patrick Egan
- Born: 28 November 1884; Carlton, Victoria
- Died: 29 July 1966 (aged 81); Armadale, Victoria
- Original team: Caulfield

Playing career^{1}
Years	Club	Games (Goals)
1909	St Kilda	1 (0)
- ^{1} Playing statistics correct to the end of 1909.

Harold Patrick Egan (28 November 1884 – 29 July 1966) was an Australian rules footballer who played with St Kilda in the Victorian Football League (VFL).

== Family ==
The son of Michael Thomas Egan, and Sarah Ann Egan, Harold Patrick Egan was born in Carlton, Victoria on 28 November 1884.

He married Myra Young (1886–1921) in 1913.
