= Youth Argosy =

Youth Argosy was an organization with tax exempt status for educational and charitable purposes which was dedicated to helping students travel internationally. It was incorporated on May 11, 1948, by Monroe and Isabel Smith who also founded American Youth Hostels. Monroe Smith, a Boy Scout executive, resigned his position with American Youth Hostels in 1949 to focus his efforts on Youth Argosy. He described the goal of Youth Argosy as to "provide travel opportunities for worthy young people of slender means that they may enjoy the benefits of foreign study and travel, that they may engage in reconstruction work, and other helpful projects and that they may make worldwide friendships regardless of race, color and creed." An age restriction was not imposed; the organization considered a student anyone seeking knowledge.

Youth Argosy was successful at first, sending more than 10,000 students abroad in 1949. Their average price for a round-trip ticket to Europe was $375 and a round-the-world ticket was about $1,495. Students traveled alone or in groups. However, it was soon troubled by new rulings of the Civil Aeronautics Board changing regulations about charter flights. Youth Argosy went bankrupt in 1951.

The company was based out of Northfield, Massachusetts. Members of the board of directors included Manfred Rauscher, Mary Ashby Cheek, John Rothschild, Armen D. Anderson, Jr., Stephen G. Cary, and Harry N. Holmes. Counsel for the organization was Greenbaum, Wolff, and Ernst.

Student travelers with the organization were referred to as 'Argonauts', although etymologically 'argosy' has no relation to Jason and the Argonauts.
