= Trevor Ferrell =

American citizen (born 1972)

Trevor Ferrell (born 1972) is an American citizen who, as a young teenager, caught the public's eye for his efforts to assist homeless people. He started Trevor’s Campaign for the Homeless in 1983, when he was 11 years old. On December 8, 1983, he watched a news program on street people. This prompted him to ask his parents, Frank and Janet Ferrell, how he could help. They drove their son into Philadelphia that night to give bedding to a homeless man who was sleeping on the sidewalk in front of the Union League in Center City. He and his parents later established a homeless shelter, Trevor's Place. His parents also authored a book, also called Trevor's Place, to further describe the actions thus accomplished, with a plea for further action. It was published in 1985.

Trevor Farrell's work was recognized by President Ronald Reagan in the President's 1986 State of the Union address. A TV movie dramatizing the shelter's activities, titled Christmas on Division Street, aired in 1991. It featured actor Fred Savage as Trevor. A 1994 episode of the series Lifestories: Families in Crisis, titled Brotherly Love: The Trevor Ferrell Story, also described his efforts.

He attended Linden Hill School in Northfield, Massachusetts.

When Ferrell was 18, the family discontinued its efforts in the campaign. Ferrell currently works for the United Parcel Service and runs a thrift shop on Lancaster Avenue in Philadelphia.

In 1985, Ferrell received the Samuel S. Beard Award for Greatest Public Service by an Individual 35 Years or Under, an award given out annually by Jefferson Awards.
