= Willimansett =

Willimansett may refer to:

- Willimansett, Chicopee, Massachusetts, a settlement in Chicopee, Massachusetts
- Willimansett Bridge, a bridge in Massachusetts crossing the Connecticut River

== See also ==
- Nipmuc, the indigenous peoples from whose language this name derives, meaning "good berries place" or "place of red earth"
