= Connecticut River railroad bridge =

Connecticut River railroad bridge may refer to:

- Connecticut River railroad bridge (Northfield, Massachusetts)
- Amtrak Old Saybrook–Old Lyme Bridge, or Connecticut River Bridge

See also List of crossings of the Connecticut River which includes these and other railroad bridges.
