= Brook Silva-Braga =

American documentary film producer (born 1979)

- Born: March 27, 1979 (age 47); Rhode Island
- Occupations: cinematographer, director, producer
- Employer: The Washington Post
- Known for: Documentary A Map for Saturday, award-winning associate producer for cable TV (HBO)

Brook Silva-Braga (born March 27, 1979) is an American documentary film producer. He shared a Primetime Emmy Award for his production of Inside the NFL. He is best known from his documentary, A Map for Saturday, in which he produced, directed, and starred. This award-winning film is about his adventures as a backpacker for 11 months in 2005, in which he stayed in various hostels, and was released in 2007. His second film, One Day in Africa, was released in 2009. In 2011 his third film was released, The China Question. He is currently an on-air reporter for The Washington Post and freelances for CBS Newspath.

== Early career ==
Silva-Braga was born and raised in Portsmouth, Rhode Island, and was a producer for HBO's Inside the NFL, for which he shared an Emmy Award.

== A Map for Saturday ==
=== Making of the film ===
Silva-Braga quit his job with HBO "and he threw it all away" to travel around the globe for almost a year in 2005, with a video camera and equipment to record his adventures. It all started when HBO sent him to Asia for work on another story, and he discovered an underground network of backpackers, which enchanted him.

"When I got home I decided to take my own big trip," he said. "The only reason not to go was I would be sabotaging my career, so the movie was an excuse to take this big trip and not feel like I was throwing away my career."

— Brook Silva Braga, as quoted by Morgan Greer.

When he quit his job with HBO, his supervisor told him that, in the future, he'd only send married producers overseas. After he finished the film, he said that it had changed his outlook on life:

(T)ime and money are commodities with an inverse relationship; you need to spend one to have the other. And traveling cheap makes you realize that time is more valuable than money.

— Brook Silva Braga

and

What I realized—not just about myself but about the world—is that time and money are commodities with an inverse relationship; to get one you need to spend the other. And I realized, for me, time is a more valuable commodity than money, so I’d rather hoard free time than extra money. Most travelers end up feeling the same way and its one reason why they find the return home so difficult, our society is built on the premise we should want more money so we can have more things, even if we don’t really have the free time to use those things.

— Brook Silva Braga

=== Synopsis ===
The film is billed as "around the world in 90 minutes." Its title describes the feeling that, "On a trip around the world, every day feels like Saturday." When "everyday is Saturday, each new person an instant best friend," you need a guide to how to deal with "always saying goodbye, and loss of connection(s)." Silva-Braga stays in hostels around the world, showing us the "hot spots" of backpacking adventure—Australia, Southeast Asia, India, and London—and out-of-the-way places like Brazil, Nepal, and Thailand. He was forced to pack only five pounds of clothes, because of his 30 pounds of video equipment, and stay in many hostels to save money. He interviews various hostellers and fellow travellers along the way as he investigates how and why people take long-term, budget travel.

=== Premiere ===
The documentary premiered at the 2007 Cleveland International Film Festival, where it was screened four times. This film fest is a competitive one, drawing 43,000 attendees, 950 submissions, but only 180 films screened in 250 showings; this film was screened 4 times rather than the average 1.38 times of the typical film at the festival. The Cleveland Film Society, organizers of the film festival, created a live podcast during a panel interview with him. The local affiliate of ABC interviewed him while he was in town for the film festival.

=== Screenings ===
A Map for Saturday was screened in Paris, France, shortly after the camera Silva-Braga used to film it was stolen.

The Hostelling International USA (HI-USA) is also screening the film at selected universities, colleges, and public libraries through its hostel councils.

A Map for Saturday was screened on the MTV network's "True Life" series, episode 58.

=== Critical reception ===
The film has garnered mostly excellent reviews. Sean Keener, CEO of BootsnAll Travel Network, wrote that it was "well done" and praised the filmmaker as "a good story teller."

The indieWIRE web site reviewed the premiere in Cleveland, stating that "director Brook Silva-Braga, despite having incredibly honorable intentions with his backpacking documentary, A Map For Saturday, misses an opportunity to provide insight about a group of people..."

== Recent programs ==
Silva-Braga posted a series of blogs at Gadling.com, which is affiliated with AOL, as well as posting at TheInterviewPoint.

On November 10, 2007, Silva-Braga was the keynote speaker at the national conference of Hostelling International USA in Washington, D.C.; HI-USA sponsored an essay-writing contest called "The Big Trip" to celebrate this event.

In January 2009, he completed his next documentary, "One Day in Africa".

In March 2023, he interviewed the "Godfather of artificial intelligence" Geoffrey Hinton at the Vector Institute in Canada for the CBS Saturday Morning Show.
