= Edward S. Shaw =

- Born: October 26, 1853; Cambridge, Massachusetts, US
- Died: October 3, 1919 (aged 65); Cambridge, Massachusetts, US
- Resting place: Mount Auburn Cemetery, Cambridge, Massachusetts
- Education: Massachusetts Institute of Technology (B.S.)
- Occupations: Civil engineer; mechanical engineer
- Years active: 1874 – c. 1917

Edward Sargent Shaw (October 26, 1853 – October 3, 1919) was a prominent civil engineer who lived in Cambridge, Massachusetts. Born on October 26, 1853, he spent most of his life in Cambridge, and graduated from the Massachusetts Institute of Technology with a bachelor's degree in civil engineering in the class of 1874; his thesis being a design for a Murphy-Whipple truss bridge. Immediately following graduation he continued his studies in some non-degree capacity at his alma mater. During his professional career, his office was located in Boston, Massachusetts. He died of heart failure at the age of 65, on October 3, 1919.

Shaw was responsible for a number of bridges in New England, including:

- Bennett's Meadow Bridge, Northfield, Massachusetts
- Schell Bridge, Northfield, Massachusetts
- Shelburne Falls Bridge, Shelburne Falls, Massachusetts
- Willimansett Bridge, Willimansett, Chicopee, Massachusetts

Shaw also held at least 3 patents, including one for the draw bridge, one for a railway superstructure design, and even a design for an electric locomotive. It is unknown if these designs were implemented in any capacity in his work.

- United States Patent 159,046, Edward S. Shaw, "Improvement in Joints for Iron Truss-Bridges", issued January 6, 1875
- United States Patent 361,029, Edward S. Shaw, "Elevated Railway Superstructure", issued April 12, 1887
- United States Patent 367,069, Edward S. Shaw, "Electric Locomotive", issued July 26, 1887
- United States Patent 564,164, Edward S. Shaw, "Bascule or Tilting Bridge", issued July 14, 1896
