= Monroe and Isabel Smith =

American youth advocates

Monroe W. Smith
- Born: January 22, 1901; Sunderland, Massachusetts, US
- Died: January 8, 1972 (aged 70); Delray Beach, Florida, US
- Other names: Money
- Occupation(s): Youth leader, outdoorsman, pilot, businessman, teacher
- Known for: Co-founder of American Youth Hostels, Youth Argosy

Isabel B. Smith
- Born: December 12, 1898; Hartford, Connecticut, US
- Died: May 3, 1985 (aged 86); Boulder, Colorado, US
- Occupation(s): Artist, teacher
- Known for: Co-founder of American Youth Hostels

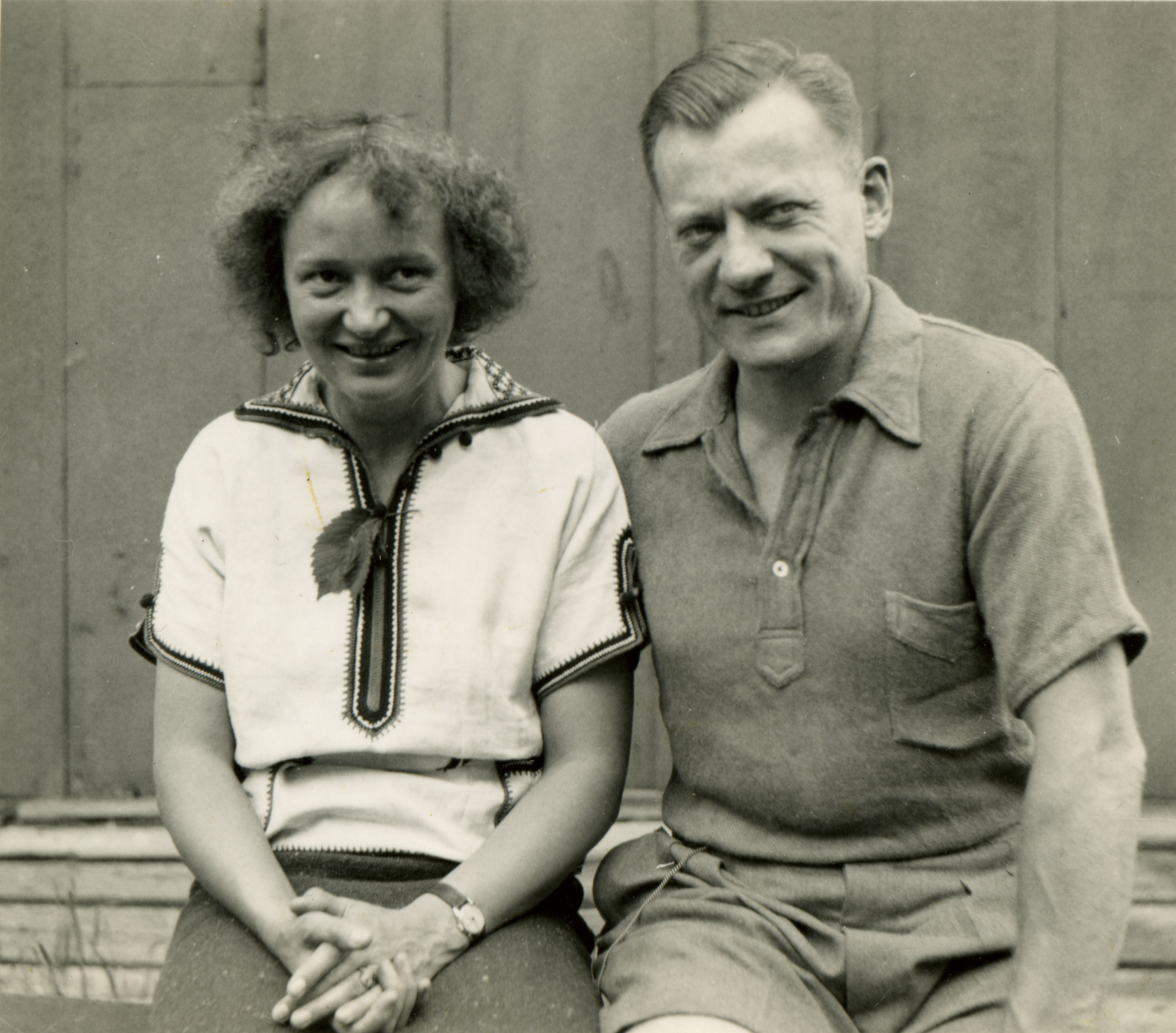
Monroe and Isabel Smith (1937)

Monroe William Smith and his wife Isabel Bacheler Smith founded American Youth Hostels in 1934. Monroe was a former Boy Scout executive and Isabel an art teacher when the young couple founded the hostels in Northfield, Massachusetts. Monroe also founded Youth Argosy, an organization intended to "provide travel opportunities for worthy young people of slender means" and resigned his directorship of American Youth Hostels in 1949. After a promising start, Youth Argosy went bankrupt in 1951, largely due to a new Civil Aeronautics Board regulation aimed at small charter groups.

== Early life ==
Monroe was born on January 22, 1901, to Carlos William Smith and Mertie May Loomis, in Sunderland, Massachusetts, and died on December 8, 1972, in Delray Beach, Florida. Isabel was born on December 12, 1898, to Francis Peck Bachelor and Rebecca Hope Fuller, in Hartford, Connecticut, and died on May 3, 1985, in Boulder, Colorado. On June 23, 1929, Monroe and Isabel were married in Vernon, Connecticut. They had three children.

Isabel attended Norwich Free Academy and pursued her studies in art until her graduation in 1917. Shortly after, she moved in with her cousin, George Inness Jr. After a year of studying under him, she was hired as an art teacher at Hartford Public High School and proceeded to work there from 1920 to 1929. Several works included Isabel's illustrations, including Early Poems of John Milton (1929), several issues of John Martin's Book, and the AYH Knapsack (1936–1948), a series of booklets designating routes and locations of prominent American Youth Hostels.

Monroe attended the Mount Hermon School for boys in 1919. Monroe received a B.A. at Wesleyan University in 1924 and subsequently an M.A. at Columbia in 1928. After graduation, he became a Massachusetts school teacher and boy scout leader.

== American Youth Hostels ==
During a scout trip to Europe, Monroe and Isabel met Richard Schirrmann and learned about his German Hostelling Organization. They later attended the second International Hosteling Meeting in 1933 and brought the idea of hosteling back to the United States, where the American Hostelling International movement was born.

On December 27, 1934, Monroe and Isabel would establish their first hostel in the Northfield Chateau in Northfield, Massachusetts. By 1938, American Youth Hostels grew to include 204 locations and 34,782 stays in just that year. Due to conflicts with the newly appointed president of American Youth Hostels, John D. Rockefeller, Jr., Monroe and Isabel resigned from American Youth Hostels in 1949. The organization's headquarters were moved to Rockefeller Center in New York City.

Monroe later began to teach at Deerfield Beach Junior High School in 1958. He would continue to teach in Delray Beach until his retirement in 1971.

== Gallery ==
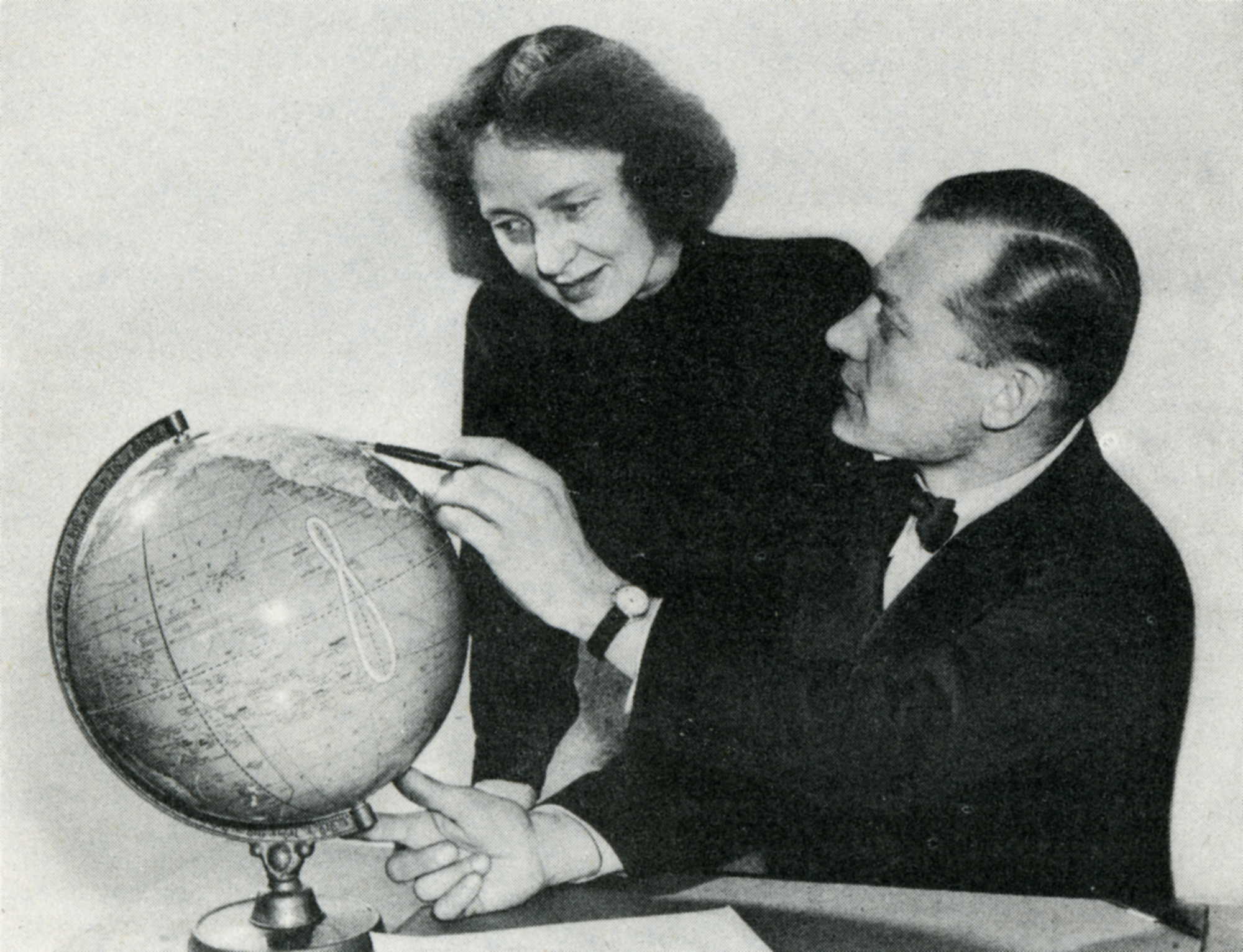
Monroe & Isabel Smith with globe

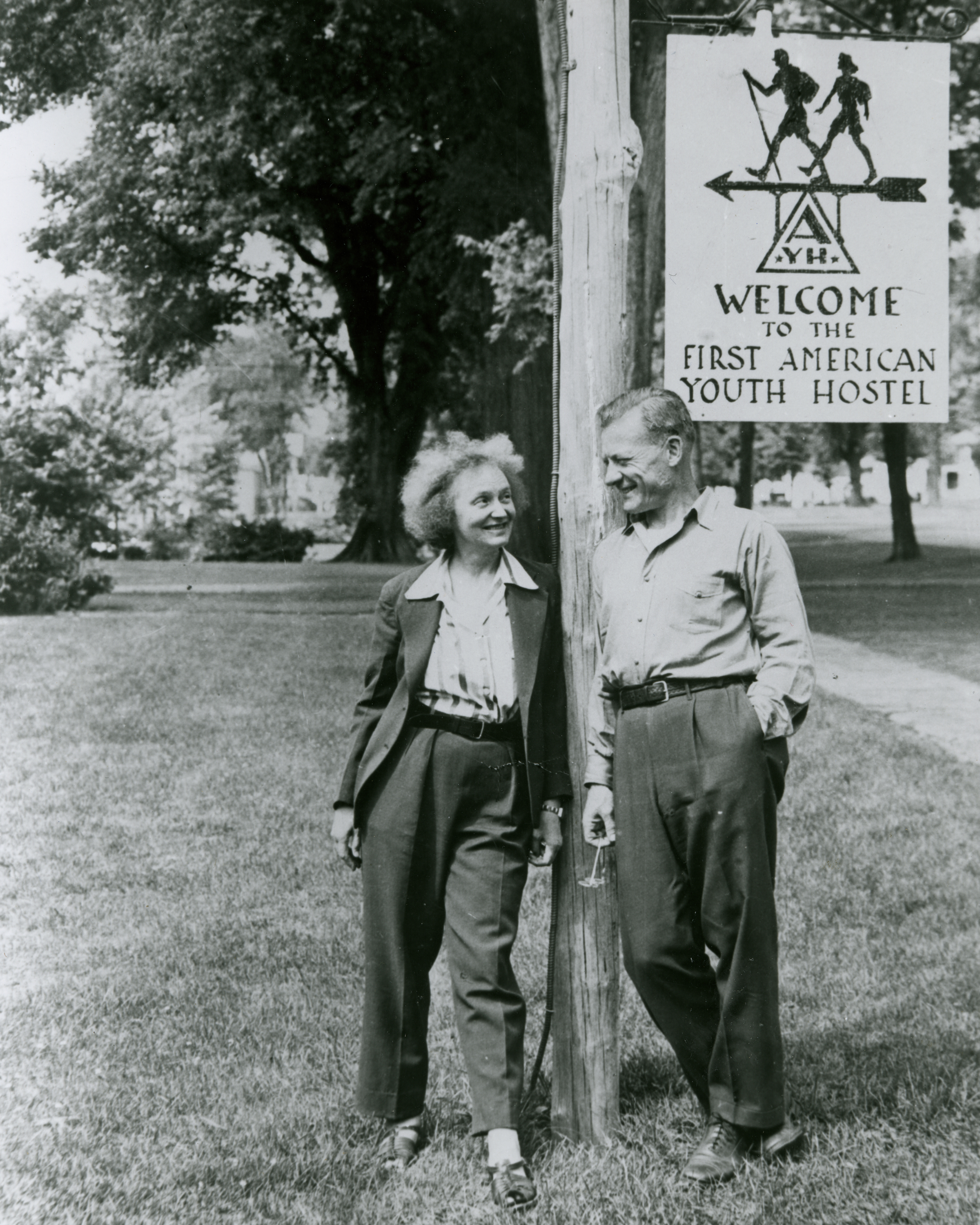
Isabel & Monroe standing in front of hostel in Northfield, Massachusetts

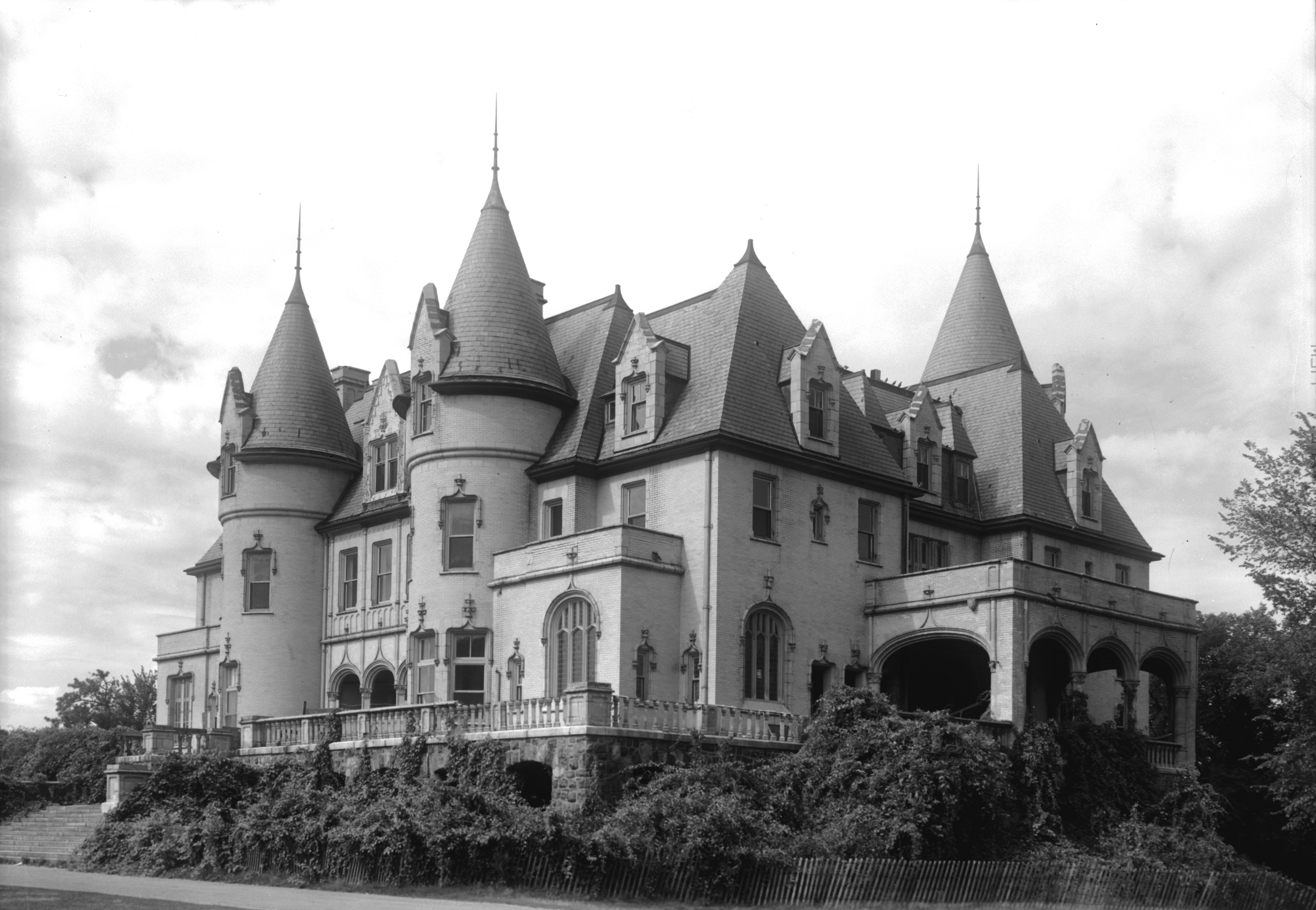
Northfield Chateau, first American Youth Hostel

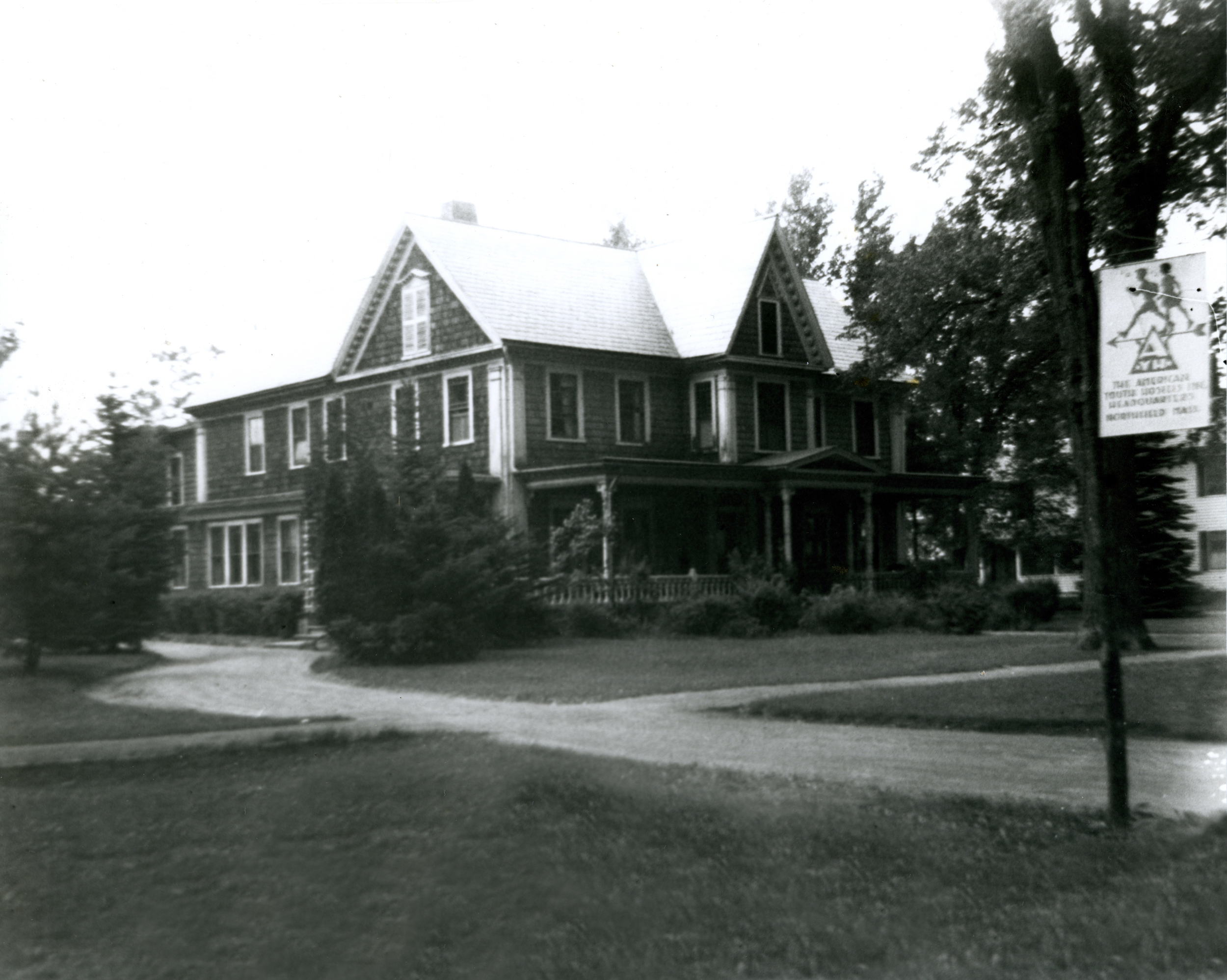
First official hostel at Northfield

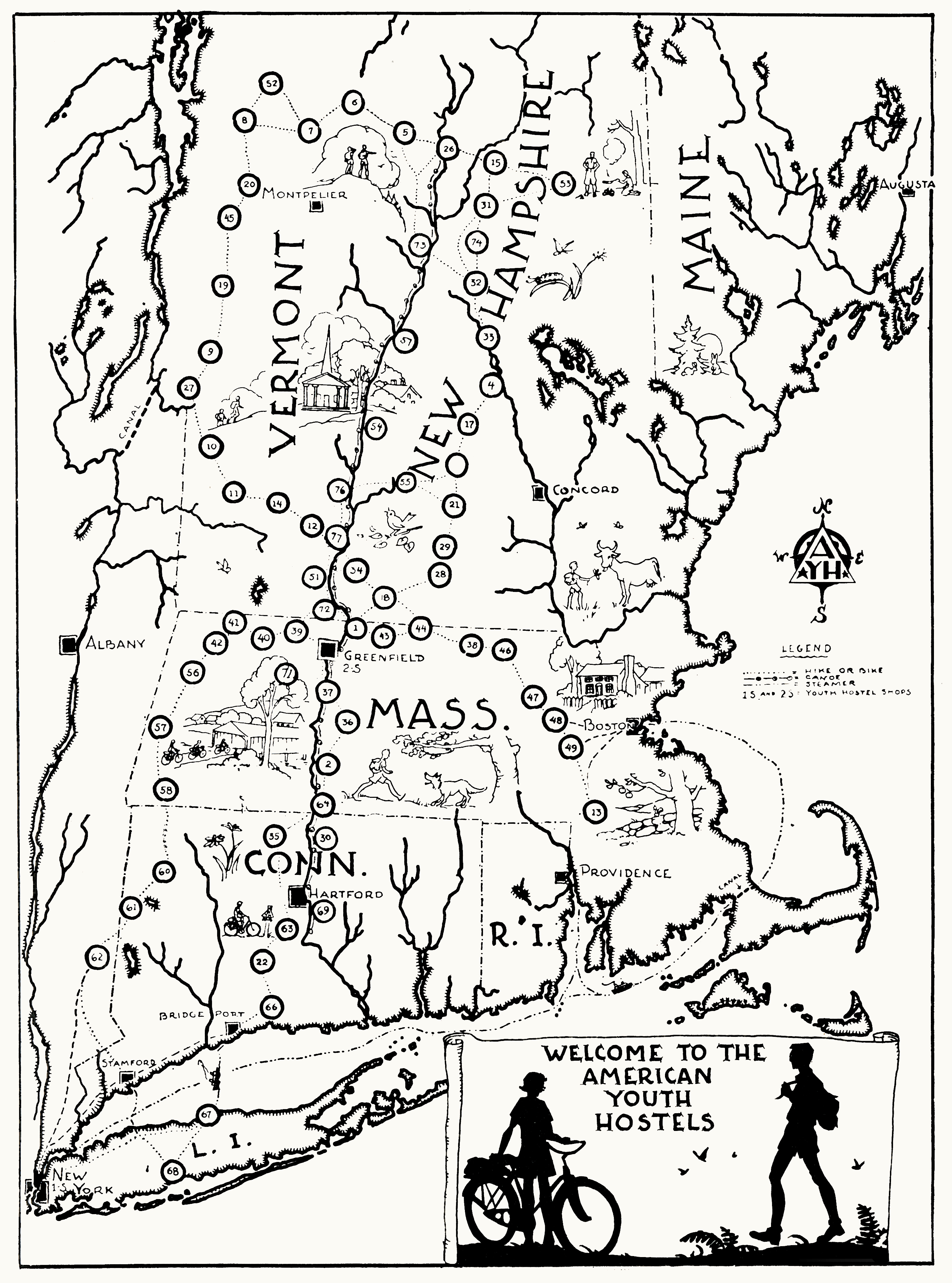
Map of New England trails and Youth Hostel locations drawn by Isabel Smith
