= Schell Bridge =

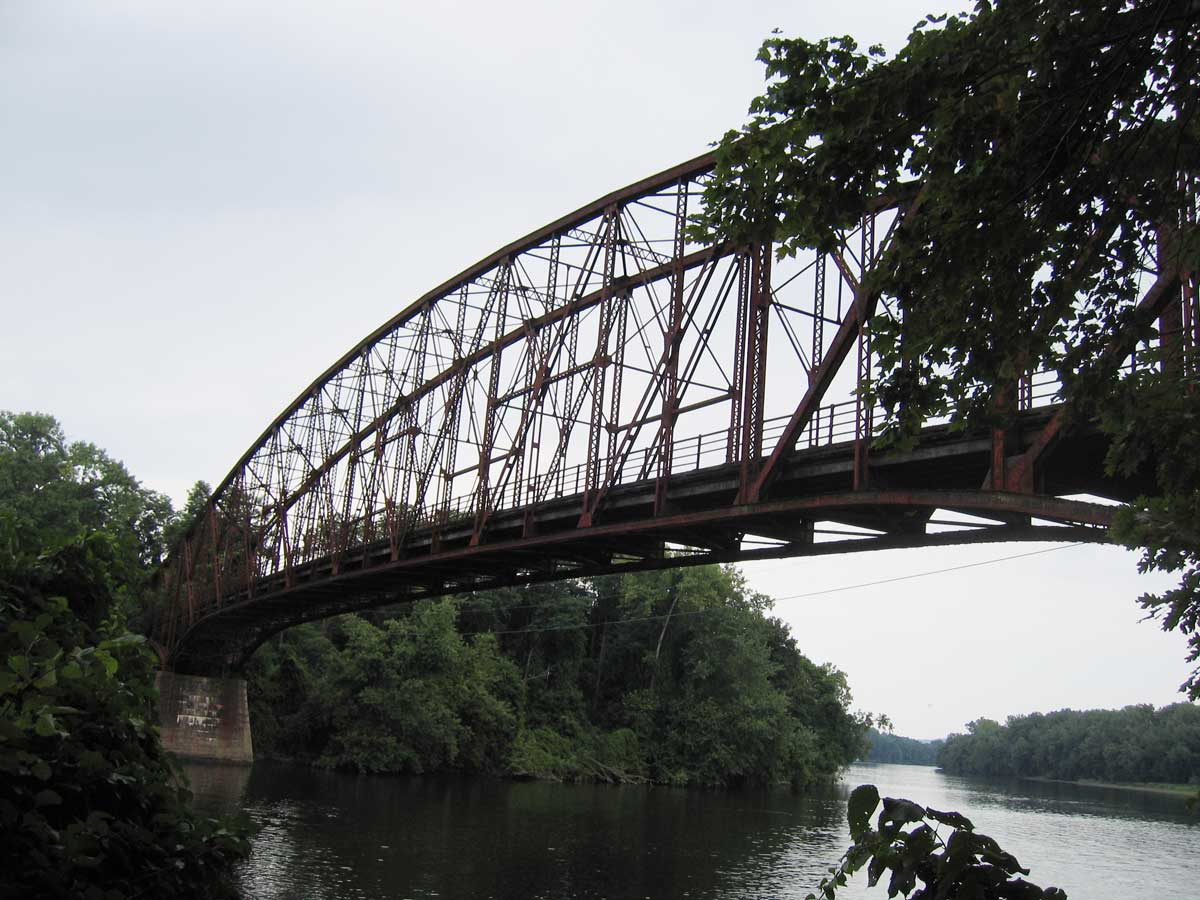
- Coordinates: 42°42′44″N 72°27′12″W
- Crosses: Connecticut River
- Locale: Northfield, Massachusetts
- ID number: MUN236002100

Characteristics
- Design: riveted steel cantilever Pennsylvania (Petit) through truss bridge
- Material: Steel
- Total length: 515 feet (157 m)
- Width: 19 feet (5.8 m)
- Longest span: 352 feet (107 m)

History
- Designer: Edward S. Shaw
- Construction start: 1901
- Construction end: 1903
- Opened: 1903
- Closed: 1985

Location
- Interactive map of Schell Bridge

The Schell Memorial Bridge is a steel cantilever Pennsylvania (Petit) truss bridge spanning the Connecticut River in the town of Northfield, Massachusetts. Designed by Edward S. Shaw, the bridge abutments and piers were built by the firm of Ellis & Buswell of Woburn, Massachusetts, and the superstructure was built by the New England Structural Company of East Everett, Massachusetts. The bridge was commissioned by Francis R. Schell, who gave $42,000 for design and construction. Construction began in 1901 and was completed in 1903. In 1985, due to advanced deterioration of the steel truss members, the bridge was barricaded and abandoned.

== History ==
The Vermont and Massachusetts Railroad had established rail service to Northfield by 1850, along a line running from Millers Falls, Massachusetts, to Brattleboro, Vermont. Even though the railway crossed the Connecticut River in Northfield, East Northfield Station was actually located in West Northfield, making it necessary for disembarking passengers to travel back across the Connecticut River on the lower deck of the rail bridge. To provide for safer and more convenient access across the river, Francis Schell gave $42,000 for the construction of a new steel bridge.

After initially being scheduled for demolition by the Massachusetts Department of Transportation in 2007 or 2008, efforts by local preservationists to save the historical landmark delayed the proposed demolition. In 2013, a group called "Friends of the Schell Bridge", which had been dedicated to saving the bridge, reversed course and sided with the state in favor of demolishing the historic bridge.

== Preservation effort ==
A year-long engineering study was performed by the Picker Engineering School at Smith College, which determined that the bridge is structurally sound and is a good candidate for rehabilitation. There has been no accessible bridge crossing between East Northfield and West Northfield since the closing of the bridge in 1985, besides the large Route 10 bridge a mile to the South. Northfield is the only town in Massachusetts to be divided by the Connecticut River.

It had been proposed that, if preserved, the bridge will be reopened only to travel by foot, bicycle, snowmobile, and emergency vehicle. It would be integrated into the tri-state Rail trail initiative connecting a series of recreational trails in northern Massachusetts, southwestern New Hampshire, and southeastern Vermont.

MassDOT has decided to replace the bridge. Refurbishing it would cost roughly $39M, whereas replacement would cost more like $16.3M. The replacement will be a steel tied-arch bridge.

== Image gallery ==
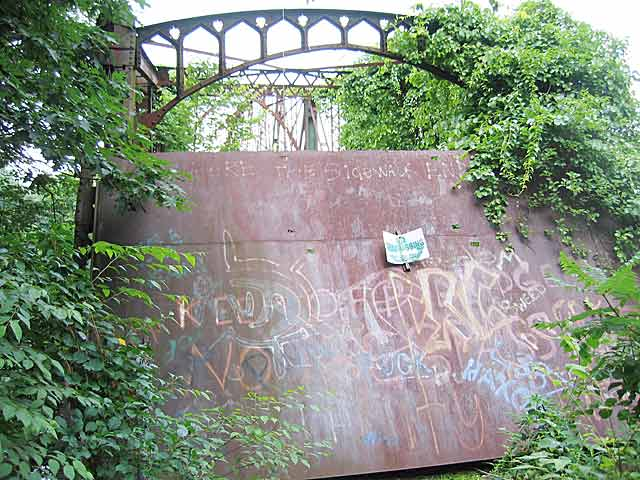
This 2007 photograph shows a steel plate across the east portal of the Schell bridge. A similar one is on the west portal, since the bridge deck is rusting through. The top of the plate reads "Where the sidewalk ends." The plate has a "NO TRESPASSING" sign bolted to it as well.

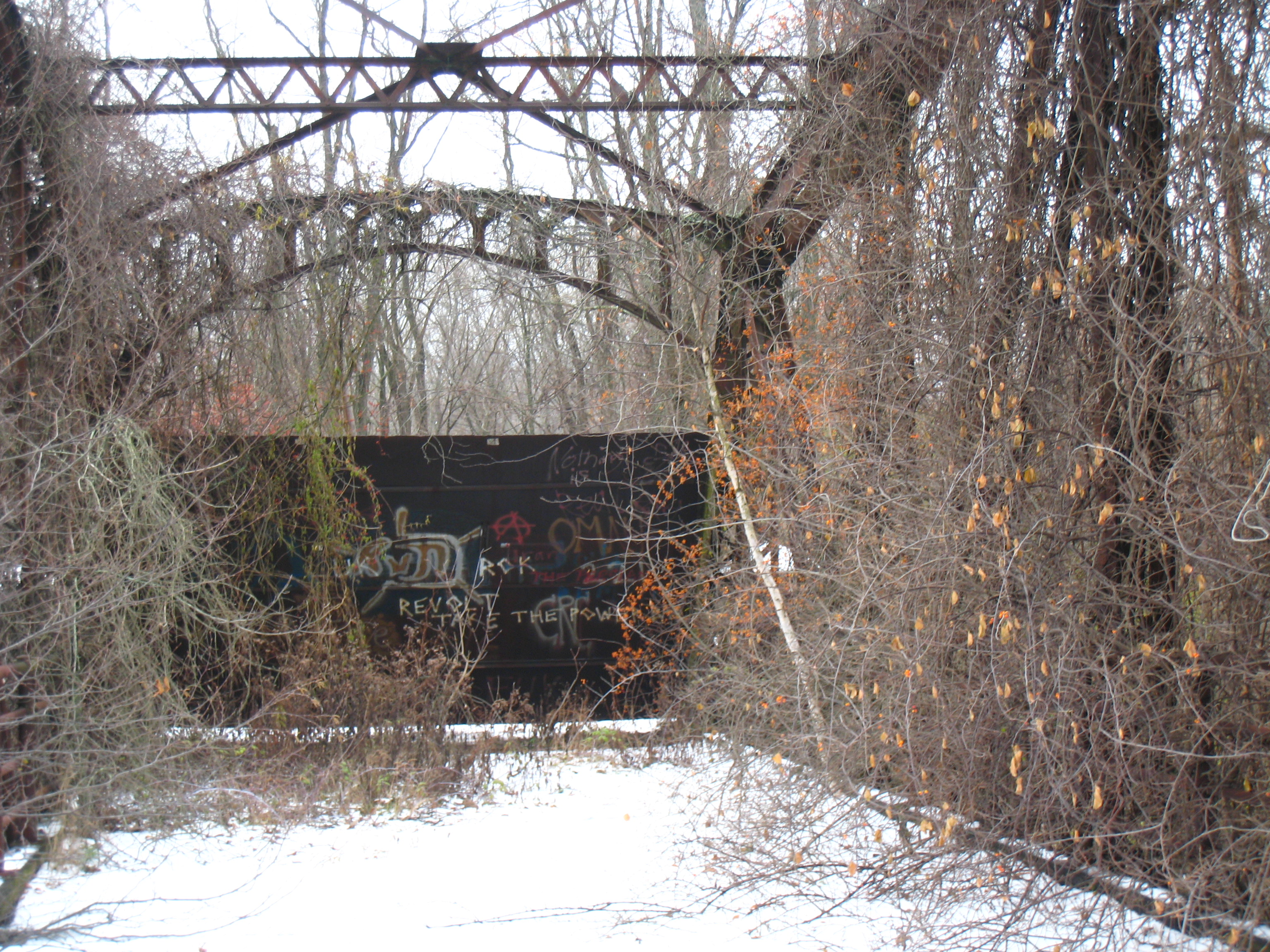
View of the metal barriers while on Schell bridge. The barriers were put up to prevent people from crossing the bridge, but many (young) townies use it as a place to escape, especially during the summer, when many jump into the river.

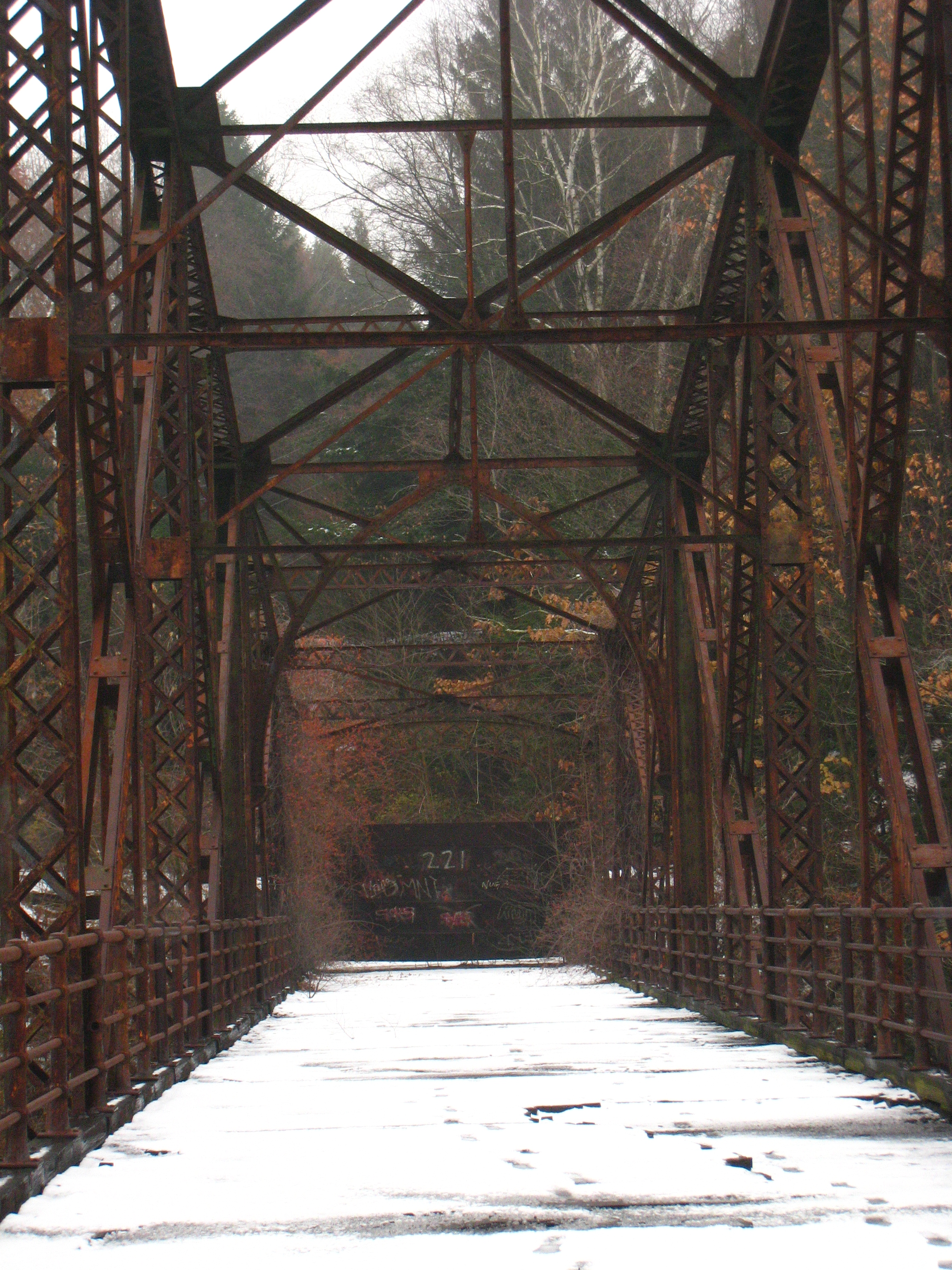
View of Schell Bridge facing the east bank of the Connecticut River.

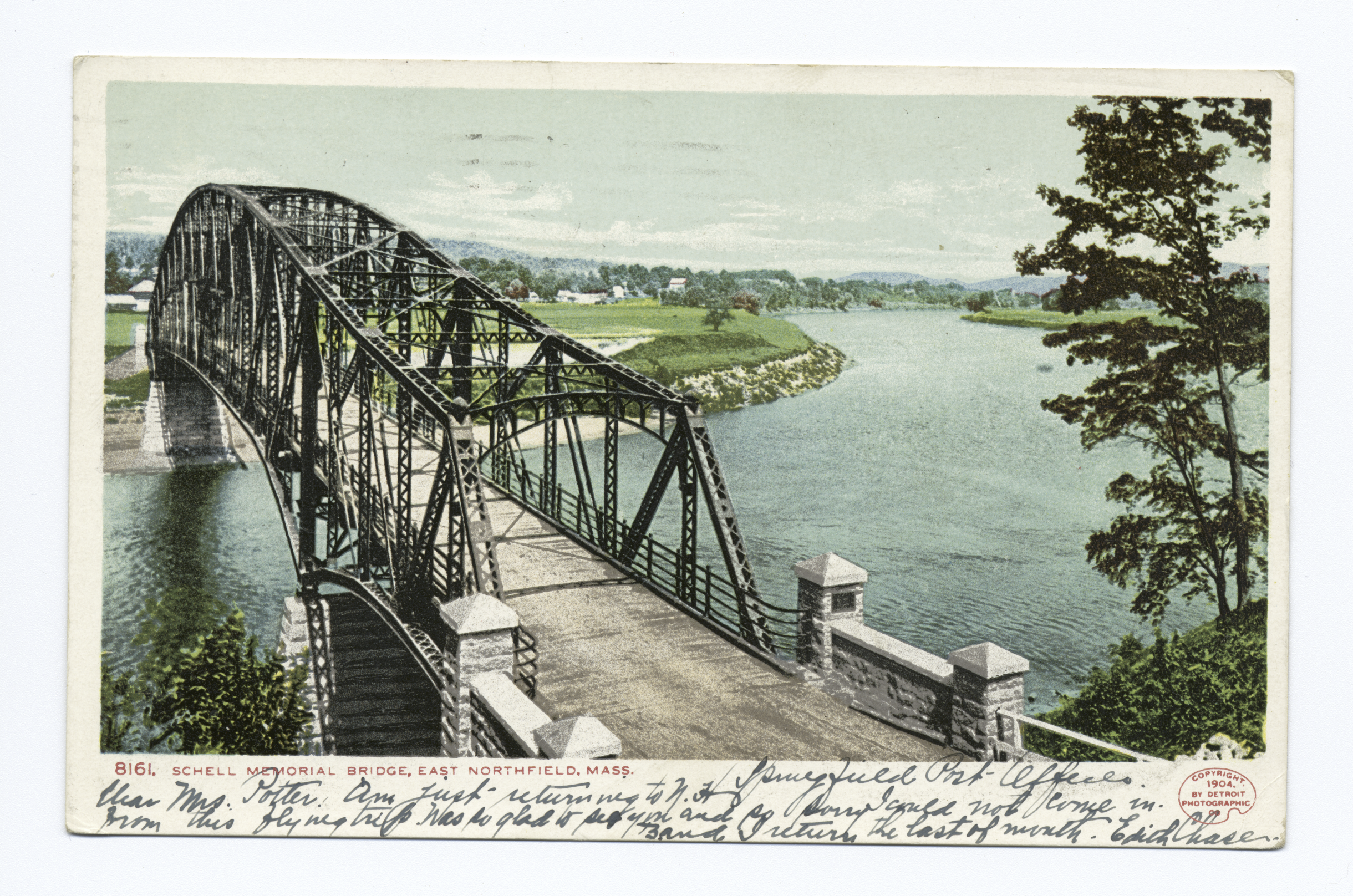
1904 postcard

== See also ==
- List of bridges documented by the Historic American Engineering Record in Massachusetts
- List of crossings of the Connecticut River
