= King Philip's Hill =

- U.S. National Register of Historic Places
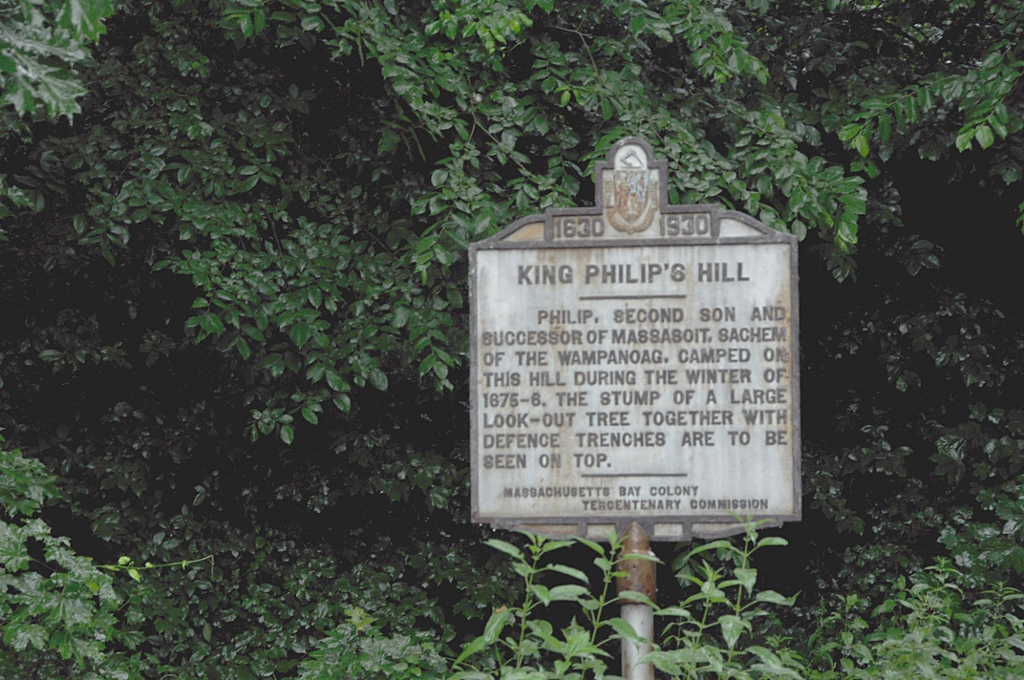
- Historic marker describing the hill

- Location within Massachusetts Location within the United States
- Location: Off Old Bernardston Rd., Northfield, Massachusetts
- Coordinates: 42°41′2″N 72°28′35″W
- Built: 1675
- NRHP reference No.: 81000106
- Added to NRHP: December 16, 1981

King Philip's Hill is a historic site off Old Bernardston Road in Northfield, Massachusetts. In 1675 the Wampanoag chief Metacom, colloquially called "King Philip" by English colonists, is claimed to have held council here during King Philip's War. The hill has evidence of what appears to be trenches and other remnants of fortification from the time, but the exact nature of these is debatable; 19th century area historian George Sheldon believed the trenches to be the work of a colonist.

The site was added to the National Register of Historic Places in 1981. It is now owned by the town, with a trail that loops around and over the hill, with informational signs along the way.

== See also ==
- National Register of Historic Places listings in Franklin County, Massachusetts
