= Lifestories: Families in Crisis =

American after school special TV series (1992–96)

- Genre: After school special
- Country of origin: United States
- Original language: English
- No. of seasons: 2
- No. of episodes: 15

Production
- Executive producers: Eve Silverman, Francine Lefrak
- Running time: 30 minutes

Original release
- Network: HBO
- Release: August 1, 1992 – February 8, 1996

Lifestories: Families in Crisis is an American after school special drama television series that aired on HBO from August 1, 1992 to February 8, 1996.

== The show ==
Lifestories: Families in Crisis deals with major issues involving individuals, mostly teenagers and young adults. The stories usually ended with the real person on which the story is based providing helpful information for others in a similar situation. Issues include a child molesting priest (played by Craig Wasson) terrorizing families, a college student with bulimia (played by Calista Flockhart) trying to deal with her problems, a football player addicted to steroids (played by Ben Affleck), substance abuse by a teenager, homosexuality and bi-sexuality involving teenagers, a teenage girl (Dina Spybey, in a Daytime Emmy Award-winning performance as Becky Bell) who has an illegal abortion and dies, a young man (played by Sam Rockwell) who is ultimately convicted of vehicular homicide after crashing into a young woman's (played by Jorja Fox) car while drunk, a boy (Adam LaVorgna as Joey DiPaolo) who contracts HIV and has to live with the disease, homelessness in Philadelphia and the major impact it has on a teenager (Ward Saxton as Trevor Ferrell) and the depression and suicide of one popular athletic teenager and its lasting effect on his best friend.

== Episodes ==
No.	Title	Directed by	Written by	Issue	Cast	Original release date
1	"The Secret Life of Mary Margaret: Portrait of a Bulimic"	Allen Coulter	Gordon Rayfield	Eating Disorders	Calista Flockhart, Christine Jones, John Cunningham, Judy Kuhn, Tovah Feldshuh, Amy Hargreaves	August 1, 1992
The true story of teenager Mary-Margaret Carter, portrayed by Calista Flockhart, and her struggle with bulimia. The episode follows the physical and emotional effects of her eating disorder and her eventual decision to seek help.
2	"Deadly Secret: The Robert Bierer Story"	Risa Bramon Garcia	Robert L. Freedman	Suicide	Wil Wheaton, Curnal Achilles Aulisio, Sarah Trigger, Audra Lindley	August 8, 1992
A teenager reminisces about a friend who died by suicide.
3	"Public Law 106: The Becky Bell Story"	Juan José Campanella	Bruce Harmon	Abortion, Parental Consent Laws	Dina Spybey, Debra Monk, Craig Wasson	August 15, 1992
A pregnant teen obtains an illegal abortion to circumvent Indiana's Parental Consent Law.
4	"Gunplay: The Last Day in the Life of Brian Darling"	Daniel Taplitz	Bruce Harmon	Gun safety; Gun control	Benari Poulten, Chris McKenna, Darren Higgins, Adam LeFevre	September 19, 1992
A 10-year-old boy is accidentally killed when he and a friend play with a gun.
5	"Blood Brothers: The Joey DiPaolo Story"	Dean Pitchford	Willy Holtzman	AIDS	Adam LaVorgna, Amy Aquino, Lawrence Taylor	September 26, 1992
A 13-year-old boy's HIV status is revealed to the public.
6	"No Visible Bruises: The Katie Koestner Story"	Juan José Campanella	Gary Lennon	Date rape	Ali Thomas, Christopher C. Fuller, Suzanne Bertish, Julie Bowen, Lisa Nicole Carson	January 12, 1993
A young woman (Katie Koestner) is the victim of date rape.
7	"Dead Drunk: The Kevin Tunell Story"	Juan José Campanella	Bruce Harmon	Drunk driving	Sam Rockwell, Jane Adams, Jorja Fox	March 15, 1993
A teen kills an 18-year-old girl while driving drunk. As part of his punishment, her parents request that he send them a one dollar check every week for the next eighteen years.
8	"More Than Friends: The Coming Out of Heidi Leiter"	Juan José Campanella	Bruce Harmon	Coming out, Sexual orientation	Sabrina Lloyd, Claire Danes, Angela Baker	January 24, 1994
A teenage lesbian couple want to attend prom, but must deal with their community's reactions.
9	"A Body to Die For: The Aaron Henry Story"	David Burton Morris	Willy Holtzman	Steroid abuse	Ben Affleck, Kamala Lopez, Ernie Hudson, Bryan Genesse, Michael Cudlitz	March 23, 1994
A teen football player turns to steroids to improve performance, and then must deal with the consequences.
10	"Brotherly Love: The Trevor Ferrell Story"	Gordon Edelstein	Bruce Harmon	Homelessness	Ward Saxton, Lázaro Pérez, Brenda Pressley	March 31, 1994
An 11-year-old boy becomes an activist for the homeless in his community.
11	"A Child Betrayed: The Calvin Mire Story"	Juan José Campanella	Bruce Harmon	Child molestation, Sexual abuse in the Catholic Church	Blake Bashoff, Craig Wasson, Brian Reiser	April 11, 1994
An altarboy is molested by a priest.
12	"Confronting Brandon: The Intervention of an Addict"	Iris Dugow	Susan Sacks	Substance abuse	Andrew Kavovit, Lisa Zane, Trevor Lissauer, Bodhi Elfman	May 20, 1994
A group of teens stage an intervention for a friend who is abusing alcohol and drugs.
13	"POWER: The Eddie Matos Story"	Jesús Salvador Treviño	Bruce Harmon	Gang violence	Alexis Cruz, Nestor Serrano, Socorro Santiago, Isaiah Washington, N'Bushe Wright	July 12, 1994
A teen drops out of school, joins a gang, and begins dealing drugs. Eventually, a gunshot wound confines him to a wheelchair.
14	"A Dangerous Affair"	N/A	N/A	Safe sex, Sex education,	Kim Frey	January 1, 1995
Kim Frey narrates her own story, detailing how a brief romantic relationship in college resulted in a diagnosis of HIV.
15	"Someone Had to Be Benny"	Juan José Campanella	Emily Murphy	Refusal of medical assistance	Michael Shulman, Donna Murphy, Suzanne Cryer	February 8, 1996
A terminally ill teenage boy sues for the right to stop his medical treatment.
