= Northfield Chateau =

Coordinates: 42°42′10.31″N 72°26′47.40″W

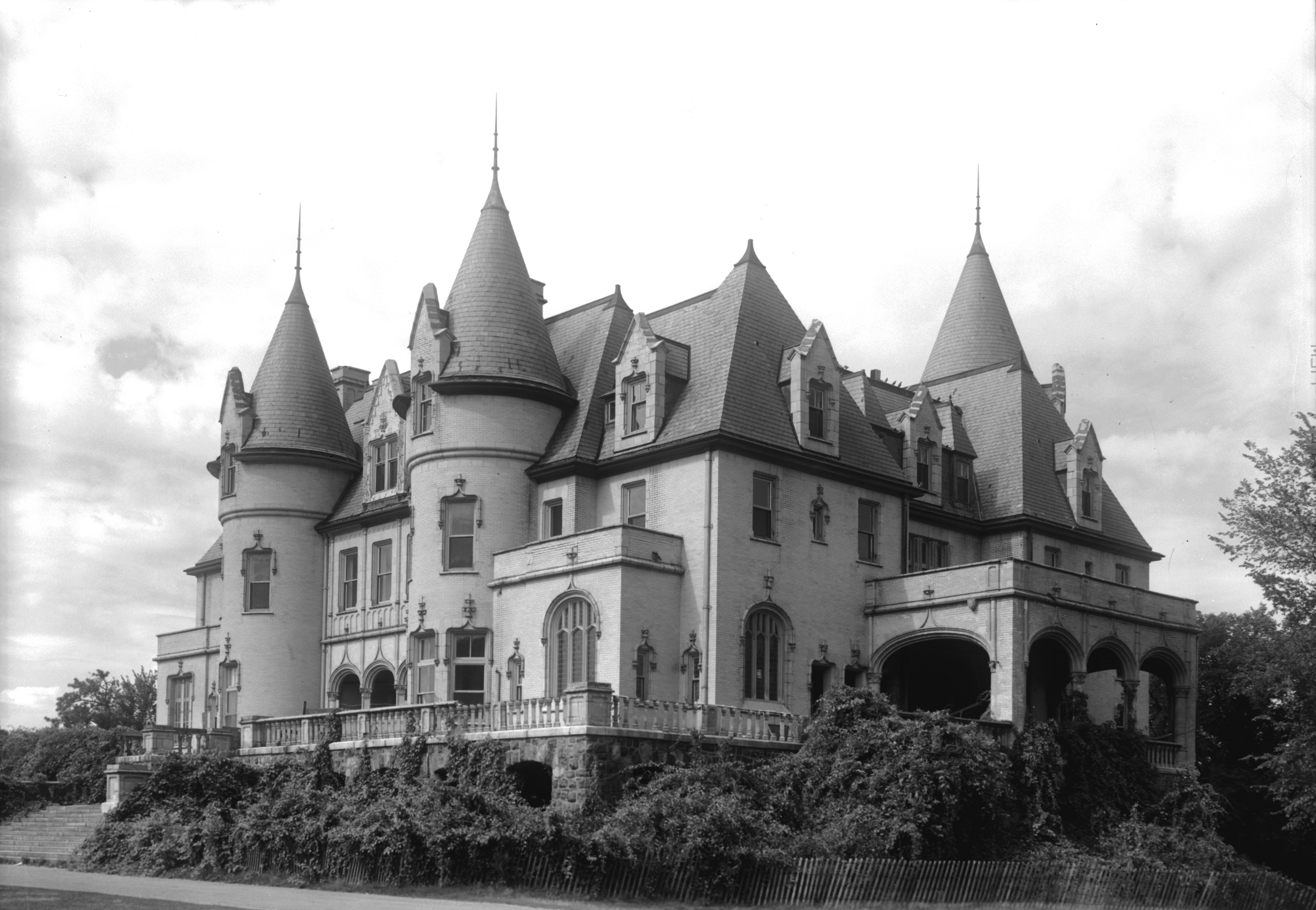
The Northfield Chateau

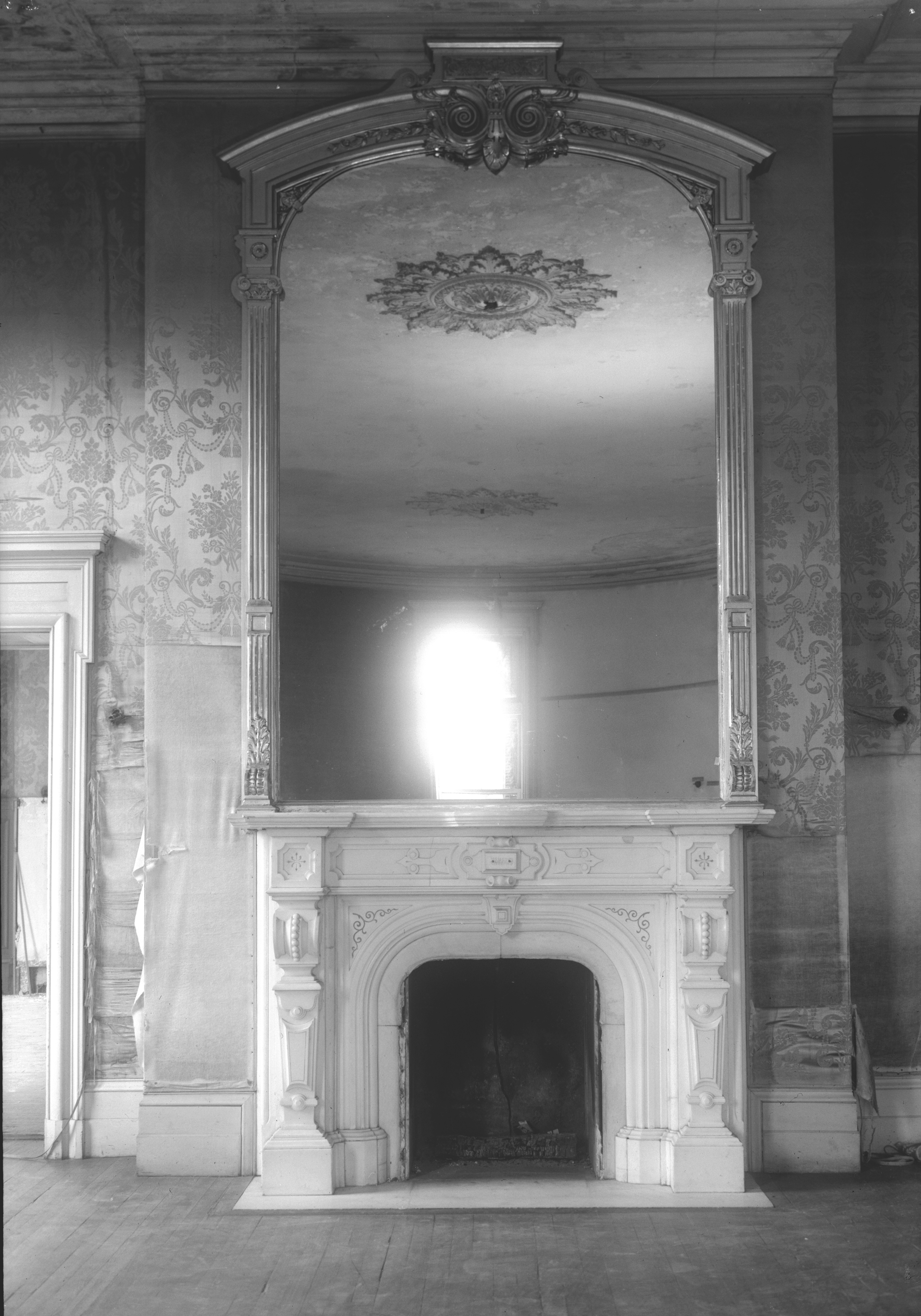
Interior

The Northfield Chateau, also variously known as Chalet Schell and Birnam House, was a large mansion on Highland Avenue in Northfield, Massachusetts. It no longer exists.

The chateau was designed by noted architect Bruce Price (of the Château Frontenac) for Francis Robert Schell, a New York capitalist attracted by his interest in Dwight Lyman Moody's work at the nearby Northfield Seminary and Mount Hermon School. It was completed in 1903 on grounds of 125 acres (51 ha).

The building was loosely patterned upon a French chateau but fanciful in style, with 99 rooms in a compact, three-story structure ornamented with prominent turrets. Contrary to popular rumors that Mrs. Schell despised the Chateau and refused to live in it, the Schells summered at their beautiful home for 25 years. It was only after the death of her beloved husband in 1928 that Mrs. Schell refused to set foot in the house again, insisting when she stayed at the Northfield Hotel during future summers that she have a room not overlooking the grand house that had been her husband's pride and joy. A server at the Inn overheard her once responding to another guest's compliments of her former home with "I hate it; I never go there."

After Mr. Schell's death, the mansion fell into disrepair and was eventually sold to the Northfield School for Girls which also owned the Northfield Hotel. They intended to use it as a meeting place and novelty hotel annex; however, it was never practical for hotel use and in the end was demolished in 1963.

Until that time, it was used by the Northfield School for Girls as the location of their prom. That is why the prom at Northfield Mount Hermon School to this day is called The Chat.

For a brief time, the basement of the chateau was also used as a youth hostel—America's first, begun by Monroe and Isabel Smith.

The Tinney Family of Belcourt Castle rescued many pieces from the chateau before its destruction, notably the mirrors which now are in their banquet hall.
