= Bennett's Meadow Bridge =

Route 10 Bridge
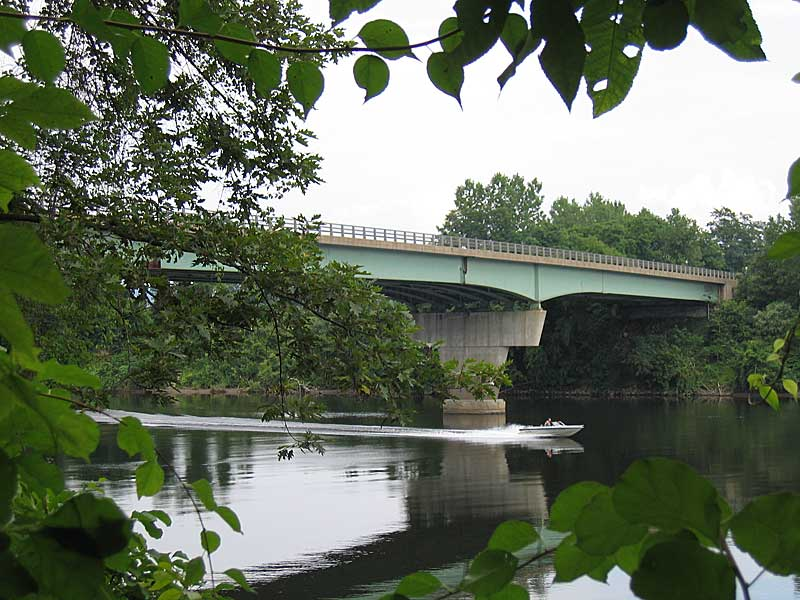
- Coordinates: 42°41′00″N 72°28′18″W
- Carries: Route 10
- Crosses: Connecticut River
- Locale: Northfield, Franklin County, Massachusetts
- Maintained by: MassHighway
- ID number: N2200412EMHDNBI

Characteristics
- Design: Steel stringer/multi-beam or girder
- Material: Steel (and concrete)
- Total length: 215.5 metres (707.0 ft)
- Width: 13.4 metres (44.0 ft)
- No. of spans: 3
- Load limit: 57.5 Metric Tons

History
- Opened: 1969

Statistics
- Daily traffic: 4,267 (2002)

Location
- Interactive map of Route 10 Bridge

The Route 10 bridge, also known as Bennett's Meadow Bridge, is a 215.5-metre (707 ft) steel stringer bridge crossing the Connecticut River in the town of Northfield, Massachusetts. The bridge carries state highway Route 10 and was built in 1969.

== History ==
The town of Northfield first authorized a bridge at or near the site of the current bridge in 1810. The bridge was built by a private corporation with the town holding stock. The new bridge was destroyed in a flood after only a few years. A horse boat ferry, known as Bennett's Meadow Ferry, replaced the river crossing. In 1897, the state legislature authorized Franklin County to construct a second bridge at or near the site of the ferry at a cost not to exceed $35,000. The new bridge was designed by Edward Shaw of Boston and was opened to traffic in 1899. The bridge was one of the first bridges erected by a then novel method without the use of false works that has since become standard procedure. The 1899 bridge was later demolished and a third bridge (the current bridge) was constructed just south of the former bridge, resulting also in the slight realignment of the highway.

== See also ==
- List of crossings of the Connecticut River
