= Joey DiPaolo =

American AIDS activist

Joey DiPaolo (born September 5, 1979) is an American AIDS activist who is HIV positive.

DiPaolo contracted HIV during a heart surgery in 1984. He required a blood transfusion, and the blood given to him came from an HIV-infected donor. DiPaolo had been diagnosed with a heart disease, atrial septal defect, and surgery was needed to save his life.

From 1985 to 1988, DiPaolo went through several episodes of sickness although none heart-related. In 1988, DiPaolo was diagnosed with HIV. At the time, doctors gave him one year to live and told his family that it would be best for them to hide his condition. Instead, DiPaolo became very active in school and, with the help of medicines, saw his health improve in 1989 to the point that he was able to live a typical life.

In early 1990, DiPaolo became so ill early during that year that doctors gave him only two days to live. He recovered and was able to attend an AIDS funds gala where he met NFL football player Lawrence Taylor. Taylor autographed a ball for DiPaolo, the two had a photo taken together, and DiPaolo disclosed that he was HIV positive.

The next day, DiPaolo's disclosure was published in local newspapers. Schoolmates' parents threatened to withdraw their children, family friends began avoiding the DiPaolos, and crowds began appearing to protest at his school. A legal battle ensued between the family and parents of children of the school that DiPaolo went to. Eventually, a New York court decided that DiPaolo would stay in the educational center he attended.

In 1992, HBO aired the Lifestories: Families in Crisis special "Blood Brothers: The Joey DiPaolo Story". DiPaolo won a lawsuit against the center from which the blood with which he was contaminated came.

DiPaolo is an AIDS activist. In 2000 he founded Camp TLC, Together Living a Challenge, for children who cannot attend regular summer camps because of AIDS. He resides in Staten Island, with his wife Lauren and daughters Joey Jayde and Vivy Rey, and operates DiPaolo's Barber Shop in Tottenville.
