= Linden Hill School =

Defunct special education boys' school in Massachusetts

Coordinates: 42.6508°N 72.4549°W

- Northfield, MA; USA

Information
- School type: Private, Boarding
- Motto: Community, Loyalty, Responsibility, Integrity, Respect
- Religious affiliation: Christianity
- Established: 1961
- Founder: George & Penny Hayes
- Status: closed
- Closed: 2012
- Headmaster: James McDaniel
- Gender: Boys
- Enrollment: 25 (2012)
- Campus: Rural
- Colors: Green & Dark Blue
- Song: Simple Gifts
- Mascot: Lynx
- Newspaper: Linden Hill Times
- Website: Website archive

The Linden Hill School was a boys' middle school in Northfield, Massachusetts that served students with dyslexia and other language-related learning disabilities. It ceased operations on June 8, 2012 due to financial problems.

== History ==
In 1961, George Hayes and his wife Penny established a boarding school that emphasized on reading and language acquisition. They wanted a lot that was comfortable inside with plenty of space outdoors to learn and play. They bought a dairy farm from Grace Bennett, whose grandson was taught by Hayes at Mount Hermon. The school accommodated 30 boys with language-based disabilities.

== Campus ==
Linden Hill School's 15-acre campus was located about four miles south of Northfield town center. In addition to many purpose-built classrooms, the school building housed classrooms, an indoor basketball court with a climbing wall, a game room, a first aid room and, of course, a large kitchen and cafeteria. There were five buildings on campus, including three dorms. The dormitories had 50 single-occupancy rooms and spacious common rooms with kitchenettes.

== Sexual abuse ==
In 2003, Michael P. Holland, the longtime headmaster of Linden Hill, stepped down after multiple allegations of sexual abuse. As of 2021, he has been accused of sexual abuse at both Linden Hill and Gow School in South Wales, New York.

The Commonwealth of Massachusetts Office of Child Care Services (OCCS) cited Linden Hill School for unlicensed rooms that students were staying in, in the headmaster’s quarters in 1999. Holland had come to Linden Hill in 1998.

While on a school trip to a conference in New York City in March 2003, Holland inappropriately touched a 15-year-old student in a hotel room. Another student on the trip called Linden Hill to report the misconduct. Holland was charged with forcible touching in the third degree, endangering the welfare of a child, and sexual abuse in the third degree. He was placed on leave.

In 2003, an unnamed Linden Hill student also accused Holland of inappropriate touching while on campus. Either this student or another accused Holland of assault after the student stayed over in the headmaster's quarters, as students often did if they were sick or stressed. Shortly after, in early 2004, one of Holland's students at Gow, reached out to the school "to state that he had been involved in an inappropriate relationship with Holland many years prior." While he was convicted in New York, Massachusetts acquitted Holland in 2005 of felony charges on grounds of failure to provide incriminating evidence.

In 2006, Linden Hill filed a lawsuit against former headmaster Holland, stating in the complaint, “As a direct and proximate of Holland’s breaches Linden Hill School has incurred substantial damages” in an attempt to recover lost revenue and costs resulting mainly from Holland’s sexual abuse publicity which resulted in a drastic drop in enrollment.

Another staff member at Linden Hill, Thomas Simmeth, who had taught at both Gow School and Linden Hill was arrested for indecent assault and battery in 2003 though never convicted. Simmeth reported to work drunk and tried to force a student to perform oral sex on him. Simmeth has also been accused of sexual abuse at The Gow School in South Wales, New York which resulted in a lawsuit involving Simmeth.

== Closure ==
Hit hard by recession and sexual abuse cases, Linden Hill School sold its campus in 2012 to pay off its mortgage and pay off significant debt. In 2013, the Redemption Church of Christ of the Apostolic Faith purchased the schools campus for $2.56 million with the intent to erect an agriculture school modeled on Tuskegee University. In May 2019, the Church turned the campus over to their lien holder in lieu of foreclosure. As of June 2019, the campus was owned by MWD Asset Servicing Inc, the lien holder.

== Notable alumni ==
- Trevor Ferrell
