= Hostelling International USA =

Affiliate of Hostelling International (HI)

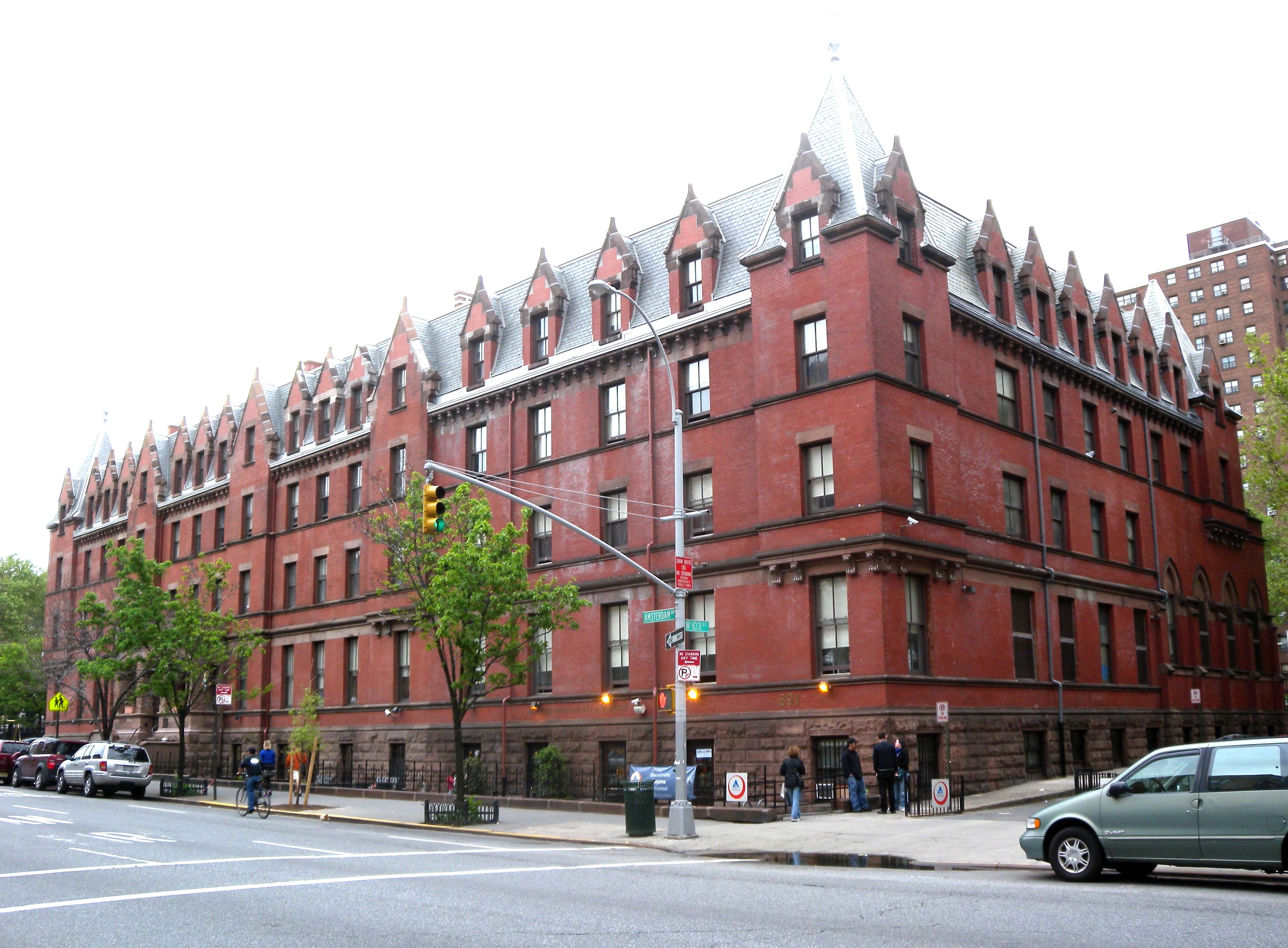
- The NYC HI hostel on Amsterdam Avenue, formerly the Association Residence Nursing Home
- Abbreviation: HI USA
- Formation: 1934
- Founder: Monroe and Isabel Smith
- Type: Youth organization
- Legal status: Nonprofit
- Purpose: Youth hostels offer inexpensive temporary accommodations for travelers.
- Headquarters: Silver Spring, Maryland
- Region served: United States
- Parent organization: Hostelling International
- Budget: ≈ $18 million (2012 revenue)
- Website: hiusa.org

Hostelling International USA (HI USA), also known as American Youth Hostels, Inc. (AYH), is a nonprofit organization that operates youth hostels and runs programs around those hostels. It is the official United States affiliate of Hostelling International (HI), also known as the International Youth Hostel Federation. It is incorporated as a not-for-profit organization, with its headquarters in Silver Spring, Maryland.

== History ==
During a trip to Europe, Monroe and Isabel Smith learned of hostelling after meeting Richard Schirrman, founder of the concept of youth hostels. The first American youth hostel was opened in Northfield, Massachusetts, in 1934 by Monroe and Isabel Smith, and American Youth Hostels was born. According to the AYH Knapsack, a series of pamphlets published by American Youth Hostels, their mission was to “To help all, especially young people, to a greater knowledge, understanding, and love of the world by providing for them Youth Hostels, bicycle trails, and foot paths in America, and by assisting them in their travels here and abroad.”

Within a year, a network of more than 30 hostels was operating throughout New England. Franklin D. Roosevelt was named honorary president of AYH in 1936, and endorsed the organization by saying, “This was the best education I ever had, far better than schools.” Josephine and Frank Duveneck opened Hidden Villa, California's first youth hostel in 1937 in a rural setting with hiking trails 35 miles (56 km) south of San Francisco. In 1947 a preaching Quaker minister, Leslie "Barry" Barret and his wife, Winnifred, turned a rundown New England farm into a rustic retreat center and youth hostel and called it Friendly Crossways. Like Hidden Villa, Friendly Crossways attracted groups promoting peace and social justice. When Hidden Villa dropped out of the HI-USA system in 2010, Friendly Crossways became the longest continually operating hostel in the US.

After World War II, international youth travel was embraced by governments as a way of encouraging interaction and understanding, and avoiding future conflict. John D. Rockefeller incorporated AYH as a nonprofit organization in 1948 after joining AYH as president.

Public awareness and hostel use increased in the 1960s and 1970s as student travel became more widespread. New hostel facility standards, management training and more consistent operating policies improved the quality of the hostel stay. AYH also sponsored self-supported bicycle tours with overnights at its hostels to such places as the Midwest and Canadian Rockies. In the mid- to late-1960s, the New York chapter staged the "3 a.m. ride" through New York City. Riders began to assemble in Washington Square, around 1 a.m. and at 3, began to ride the deserted streets of Manhattan. Around dawn, the riders took the Staten Island ferry and ended the ride at a beach on Staten Island.

The 1980s marked a decade a growth for American Youth Hostels. Major association hostels were opened in Boston, San Francisco, Santa Monica, Seattle and Washington, DC. In 1986, AYH approved its first strategic plan which affirmed the importance of AYH hostels in major cities, as well as membership growth and hostel based programming. Both hostel overnights and membership grew throughout the decade.

The growth continued in hostel overnights throughout the 1990s. IYHF positioned the international movement for growth in the mid 1990s with the adoption of a common name and logo, and new quality standards for its more than 4,500 hostels. As the U.S. affiliate of IYHF, AYH embraced "Hostelling International" and the blue triangle and adopted a more focused hostel quality program, becoming HI USA.

By the early 2000s, HI USA made quality a priority and steadily closed hostels over the next decade that didn’t meet the highest of standards. The number of hostels went from 136 in 2001 to 53 in 2012. However, hostel overnights have remained strong. In fact, in 2012, HI USA hosted as many overnights across its 53 hostels as it did in 2003 when it had 103 hostels.

During the slimming down of hostels, a new focus for HI USA took hold. In 2008, the council model of governance - whereby 26 councils oversaw the majority of hostel operations – was questioned as the most effective model for moving forward. After several years of intensive research, debate, and discussion, the councils voted on June 11, 2011, to dissolve their entities into one unified, national organization, as a way to combine assets and resources to become a stronger organization. By 2012, the 14 councils became part of the unified organization by year’s end and HI USA had 53 hostels in its network.

== Hostels ==
The flagship residence of the American Youth Hostels in the United States is in New York City, located in a landmark building designed by noted architect Richard Morris Hunt. This popular hostel occupies the entire east blockfront of Amsterdam Avenue between 103rd and 104th Streets within the Frederick Douglass Houses superblock in Manhattan. Other locations currently include:

- HI Boston Hostel
- HI Chicago, The J. Ira and Nicki Harris Family Hostel
- HI Hyannis Hostel
- HI Los Angeles Santa Monica Hostel
- HI Martha's Vineyard Hostel
- HI New Orleans Hostel
- HI New York City Hostel
- HI Pigeon Point Lighthouse Hostel
- HI Point Montara Lighthouse Hostel
- HI Sacramento Hostel
- HI San Diego Downtown Hostel
- HI San Francisco Downtown Hostel
- HI San Francisco Fisherman's Wharf Hostel
- HI Truro Hostel

== Leadership ==
As of March 2024, the board of directors had the following members:

- Charles Hokanson, Board Chair; president and CEO of Hokanson Consulting Group
- Violet Apple, Board Vice Chair; CEO of Girl Scouts of Central Maryland
- Erin Hamant, Board Secretary, Senior Operations Analyst for the City of West Hollywood
- Nicole Sandoval, Board Audit Committee Chair, Compliance Manager at Wells Fargo & Company
- Nick Andrade
- Berkita S. Bradford, Department Chair of Hospitality Management at Virginia State University
- Erika Byrnison, Director of Marketing Operations for 92nd Street Y
- Lisa Gurwitch
- Wangari Kamau
- Walt Knoepfel
- Bruce Marsden, Financial Consultant at Riverside Research Institute
- Dean Papademetriou

== See also ==
- Backpacking (travel)
