= Connecticut River railroad bridge (Northfield, Massachusetts) =

Rail bridge at Northfield, Massachusetts
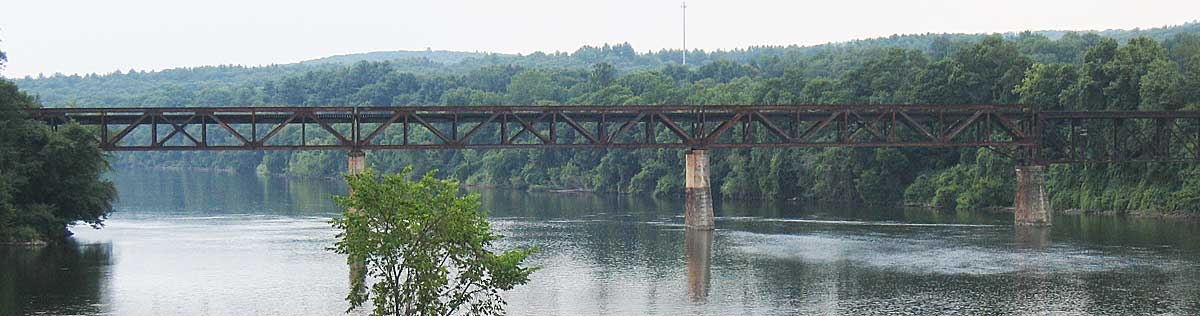
- Coordinates: 42°42′22.40″N 72°27′33″W
- Carries: New England Central Railroad and Amtrak Vermonter
- Crosses: Connecticut River
- Locale: Northfield, Franklin County, Massachusetts

Characteristics
- Design: Deck truss bridge
- Material: Metal truss, on masonry piers
- No. of spans: 4
- Piers in water: 3

History
- Construction end: 1903

Location
- Interactive map of Rail bridge at Northfield, Massachusetts

The rail crossing of the Connecticut River (United States) at this location originates from the Vermont and Massachusetts Railroad. The V&MRR was chartered in 1844 and completed an extension between Millers Falls, Massachusetts and Brattleboro, Vermont by 1850. Alvah Crocker, a paper and railroad magnate and U.S. Representative, was the first president of the V&MRR. Initially, the V&MRR was operated by Crocker's Fitchburg Railroad.

This rail bridge was used by Amtrak's Vermonter passenger service until December 2014.

== Notes ==
A: Please place direct quotations from cited book here - then reference them in text above with Cref.
B: United States Geological Survey topographic map showing the bridge as the New London Northern Railroad bridge.
C: United States Geological Survey topographic map showing the bridge as the Central Vermont Railway bridge.
