= Willimansett Bridge =

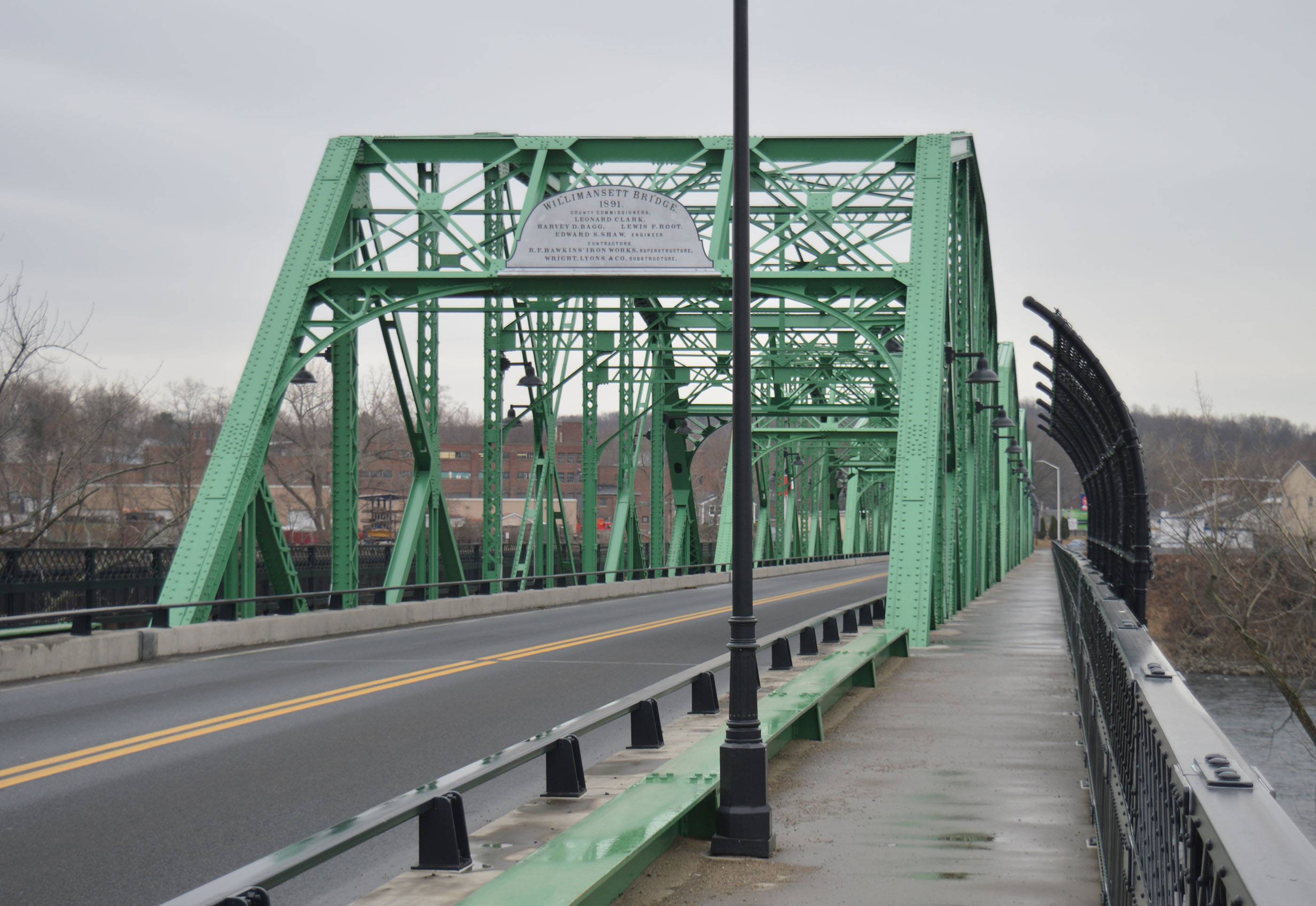
- Coordinates: 42°11′42″N 72°36′05″W
- Carries: pedestrian and vehicular traffic Route 116 / Route 141 plumbing
- Crosses: Connecticut River
- Locale: Chicopee, Massachusetts to Holyoke, Massachusetts

Characteristics
- Design: truss bridge
- Total length: 800 ft (240 m)
- Load limit: 7 tons for small trucks 8 tons for medium trucks 12 tons for large trucks

History
- Designer: Edward S. Shaw
- Opened: 1892

Location
- Interactive map of Willimansett Bridge

The Willimansett Bridge is a steel truss bridge over the Connecticut River located between Chicopee, Massachusetts and Holyoke, Massachusetts. It carries Massachusetts state routes 116 and 141.

== History ==
Prior to its construction, a "free bridge at Willimansett" was discussed at least as early as 1886, with the Commonwealth's committee on roads and bridges visiting the site in an official capacity on March 18, 1886. The bridge was built in 1891 by Richard F. Hawkins Ironworks (superstructure) and Wright Lyons and Company (substructure) with Edward S. Shaw as engineer at an original cost of $178,326.69.

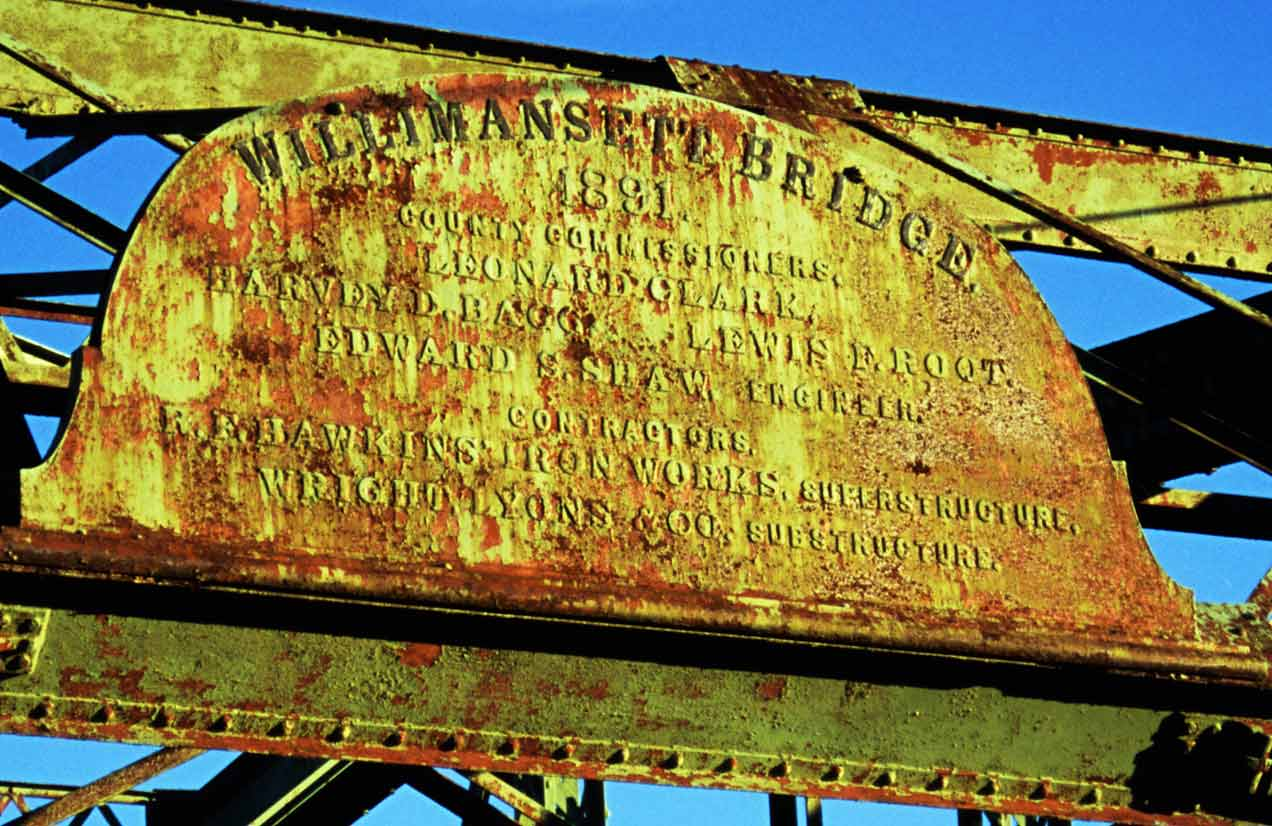
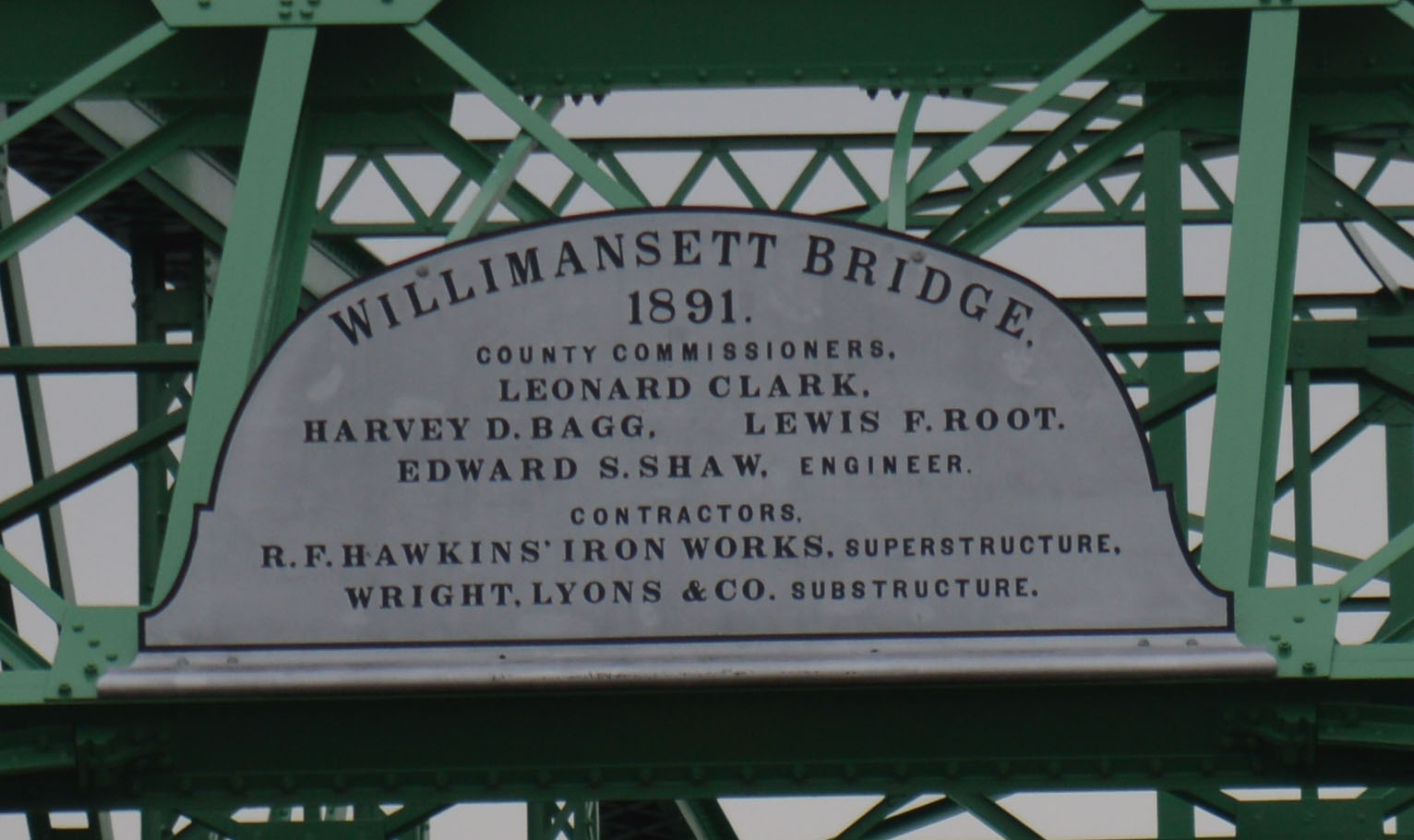
Maker's plaques of the bridge before and after the renovations of 2011 – 2015.

The bridge received new weight restrictions in the summer of 2007. A refurbishment project began in August 2011. The $19 million project included bridge deck replacement, sidewalk replacement, bridge rail replacement, substructure repairs, cleaning & painting of structural steel. Girders, steel trusses and one or more of the piers will be replaced. The bridge closed to traffic during the 2.5 year planned construction but was usable by pedestrians during the project. The original contractor went bankrupt, causing a 9-month delay. Northern Construction took over the work. In 2014, an additional cost $3 million was added to the project. The bridge re-opened on June 12, 2015.

== See also ==
- List of crossings of the Connecticut River
