= Northfield, Massachusetts =

- Town
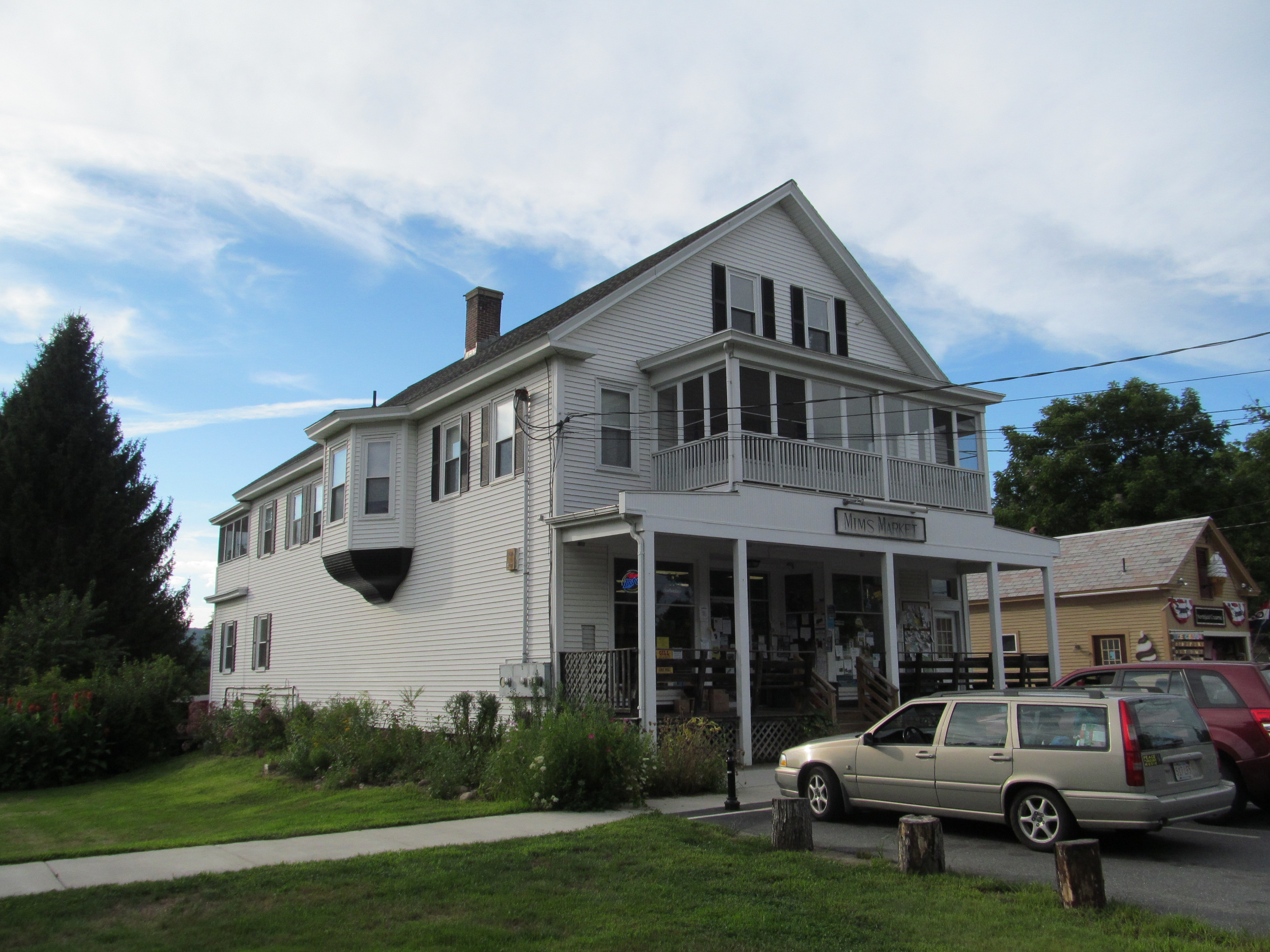
- Mim's Market

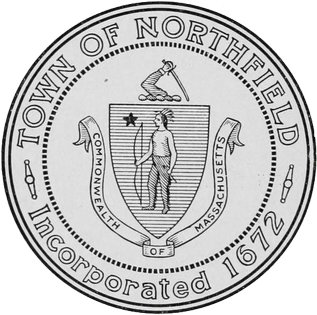
- Seal

- Location in Franklin County in Massachusetts
- Coordinates: 42°41′45″N 72°27′12″W
- Country: United States
- State: Massachusetts
- County: Franklin
- Settled: 1673
- Incorporated: 1723

Government
  - Type: Open town meeting

Area
  - Total: 35.4 sq mi (91.6 km^{2})
  - Land: 34.3 sq mi (88.8 km^{2})
  - Water: 1.1 sq mi (2.8 km^{2})
- Elevation: 381 ft (116 m)

Population (2020)
  - Total: 2,866
  - Density: 83.6/sq mi (32.3/km^{2})
- Time zone: UTC-5 (Eastern)
  - Summer (DST): UTC-4 (Eastern)
- ZIP Code: 01360
- Area code: 413
- FIPS code: 25-47835
- GNIS feature ID: 0619381
- Website: www.northfieldma.gov

Northfield is a town in Franklin County, Massachusetts, United States. Northfield was first settled in 1673. The population was 2,866 at the 2020 census. It is part of the Springfield metropolitan area, Massachusetts. The Connecticut River runs through the town, dividing West Northfield from East Northfield and the village of Northfield, where the town hall is located.

Part of the town is included in the census-designated place of Northfield.

== History ==
The village of Skakeat/Squakheag was the site of modern-day Northfield and was home to the Nashaway Nipmuc and Sokoki Abenaki. Northfield was first colonized by European settlers in 1673 and was officially incorporated in 1723. Indian Land Deeds for Hampshire County, Including Later Berkshire, Franklin, and Hampden Counties, gives the name of the otan (village) as Squakheag (a Nipmuk name), also Skakeat (Sokoki Abenaki). John Eliot, in his Brief Narrative...History of the Nipmuk, attributes this village to the Nipmuc.

The territory was successfully defended a number of times by Native Americans. The Battle on Beer's Plain occurred in Nothfield in 1675. Peter Jethro, a Praying Indian, a son of Tantamous, a Nipmuc originally from Concord who was reputed to be a pauwau, spent a brief stint in the Northfield area as a Christian minister before a massacre plunged him into King Philip's War. During the war, Peter Jethro freed a settler who was being held captive near Northfield. As a result of the conflict, New England settlers were occasionally taken north to Quebec, held as hostages by the, causing the town to revert to American Indian control a few times. Eventually, conflicts with the Native American population ceased after most of the native population was displaced and/or sold into slavery as a result of King Philip's War and after a series of massacres of local Indian villages.

During Dummer's War, on August 13, 1723, Gray Lock raided Northfield, and four warriors killed two citizens near the town. The next day they attacked Joseph Stevens and his four sons in Rutland. Stevens escaped, two boys were killed, and the other two sons were captured.

Much of Northfield's development in the late nineteenth century was spurred by the work of evangelist Dwight Lyman Moody, a native of Northfield who established the Northfield Seminary for Girls in 1879 on a sweeping hillside in East Northfield. The school was the site of Moody's religious conferences, which attracted thousands of visitors to Northfield each summer. The influx of visitors led to the development of the town as a summer resort, especially after the opening of the Northfield Hotel in 1887. Francis Schell, a New York capitalist attracted by his interest in Moody's work at the Northfield Seminary, commissioned architect Bruce Price to design a summer home, which became known as the Northfield Chateau. Patterned after a French château but fanciful in style with prominent turrets and 99 rooms. The chateau was later converted into a guest house to go with the Northfield Hotel which was across the street. A golf course was installed on the large grass lawns of the hotel. In the 1960s, Northfield Mount Hermon School purchased the hotel and the Chateau. It was decided they did not want to manage these venues and the hotel and the Chateau were demolished. The school failed to notify guests of the closing of the Hotel and people were still arriving while the building was being demolished. All that is left today is the golf course and some former workers maintenance buildings. Northfield Mount Herman School sold the property to Snow's Landscaping in the 2010s. Snow's manages the Northfield Golf Club and event venue.

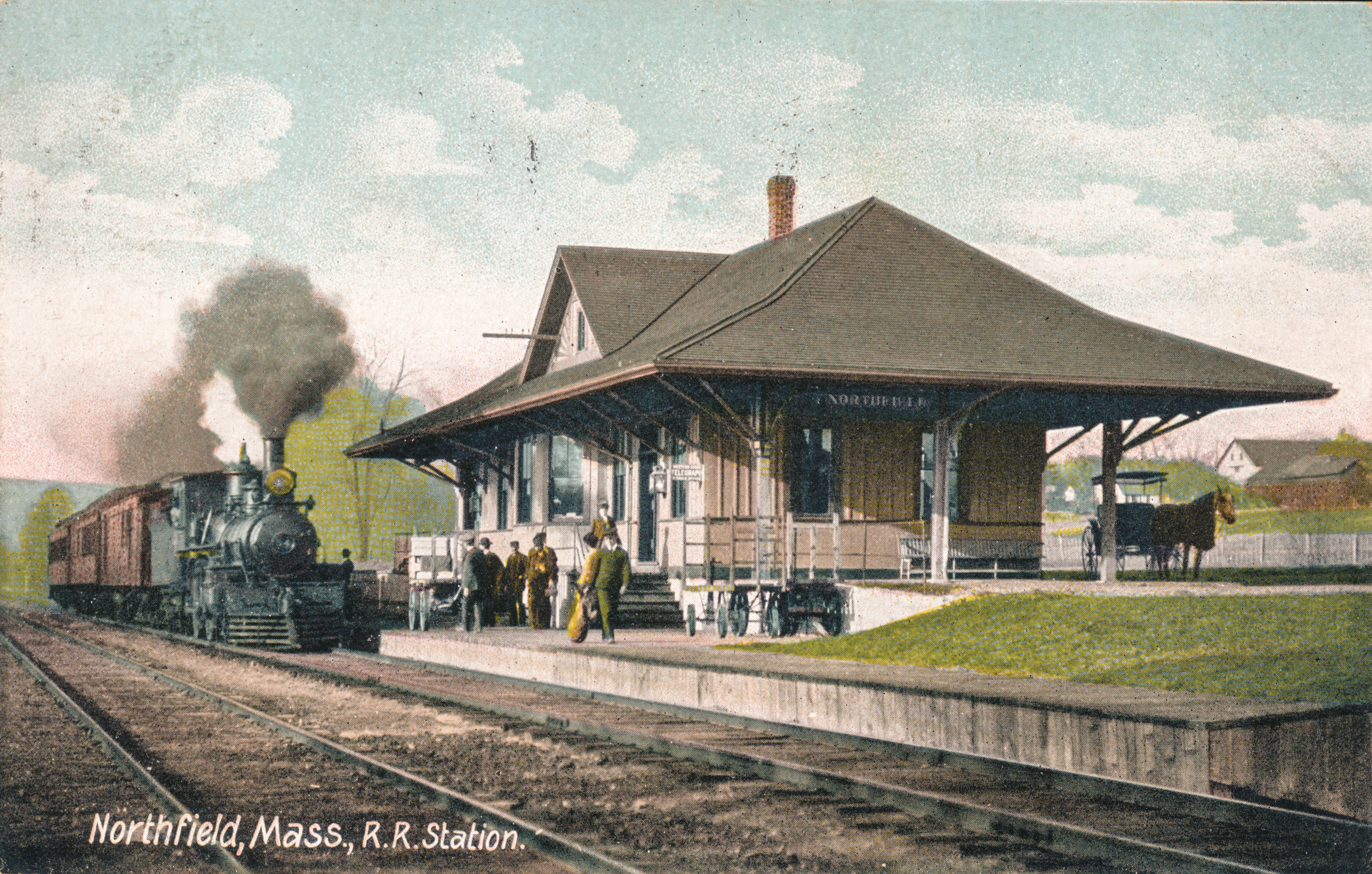
Northfield railroad station in 1911

The Vermont and Massachusetts Railroad had established rail service to Northfield by 1850, along a line running from Millers Falls, Massachusetts, to Brattleboro, Vermont. Even though the railway crossed the Connecticut River in Northfield, East Northfield Station was actually located in West Northfield, making it necessary for disembarking passengers to travel back across the Connecticut River on the lower deck of the rail bridge. To provide for safer and more convenient access across the river, Francis Schell gave $45,000 for the construction of a new steel bridge. The Schell Bridge is a Pennsylvania truss structure of impressive design, which crosses the river in one span of 515 feet (157 m).

In 1971 the Northfield Mount Hermon School was formed by the merger of the Northfield Seminary and the Mount Hermon School for boys, which Moody had founded in 1881 in nearby Gill. The school continued to operate as one school with two campuses some 5 miles (8 km) apart on opposite banks of the Connecticut River until 2005 when the school consolidated its operations on the Mount Hermon campus in Gill. The school's former campus in Northfield was purchased by Hobby Lobby, an Oklahoma-based chain of arts and crafts stores, as of December 2009 to be used as the campus for the new C.S. Lewis College, run by the California-based C.S. Lewis Foundation. Renovation began on the disused buildings in summer 2010, and the college expected to open for instruction in fall 2012, pending accreditation, but failed to meet the necessary funding threshold. Moody's birthplace and grave site, located on the Northfield campus, remain as a historic site. In December 2013, Hobby Lobby donated the auditorium, used for Moody's religious conventions, and the school's original Romanesque Revival buildings and grounds to the National Christian Foundation, which is responsible for identifying a viable owner for the property. In 2017, the NFC agreed with Thomas Aquinas College (TAC) of Santa Paula, California on a plan for TAC to open its second campus on the Northfield site. Classes at TAC's Northfield campus began in August 2019.

In June 2016, The Trust for Public Land and the Massachusetts Department of Conservation and Recreation ensured the complete and permanent protection of 1,300 acres of forest land which was previously the Northfield campus and owned by the Northfield Mount Hermon School for over a century. Although now a permanent part of the Northfield State Forest, it had been the largest parcel of unprotected land in the Commonwealth of Massachusetts. The property includes woodlands, trails and a reservoir which will be managed by the DCR to ensure public access for recreation as well as serve as important habitat for wildlife.

== Geography and transportation ==
According to the United States Census Bureau, the town has a total area of 35.4 square miles (91.6 km^{2}), of which 34.3 square miles (88.8 km^{2}) is land and 1.1 square miles (2.8 km^{2}), or 3.07%, is water. Northfield is the only town in Franklin County to be divided by the Connecticut River, though only partially; the river forms the southwestern border of town. Several brooks flow directly into the Connecticut River within town, with the others (on the east side of the hills) leading into the Millers River, itself a tributary of the Connecticut. The western banks lie near Pond Mountain, whose peak is in neighboring Bernardston. To the east of the river are several mountains in the Upper Bald Hills, including Northfield Mountain, Brush Mountain (the highest point in town), Beers Mountain, South Mountain, Notch Mountain and Hogback Mountain (along the New Hampshire border). The southeastern corner of the town is protected as part of the Northfield State Forest, with part of the northwest corner protected as part of Satan's Kingdom Wildlife Management Area. Most of the inhabited areas in town lie along the Connecticut River, and the town's main villages include East Northfield, Mount Hermon Station, Gill Station, Northfield Farms, and Sky Farm (between Brush Mountain and Northfield State Forest). The town is also home to a cross-country skiing area at Northfield Mountain, which is also traversed by the Metacomet-Monadnock Trail.

Northfield is located at the junction of the Massachusetts, New Hampshire and Vermont state borders along the Connecticut River. The town center is located 12 miles (19 km) northeast of Greenfield, 44 miles (71 km) north of Springfield, 52 miles (84 km) northwest of Worcester and 84 miles (135 km) west-northwest of Boston. The town is bordered by Vernon, Windham County, Vermont, and Hinsdale and Winchester, Cheshire County, New Hampshire, to the north, Warwick to the east, Erving to the south, Gill to the southwest and Bernardston to the northwest.

The town has no interstate highways, the closest being Interstate 91 in neighboring Bernardston, the nearest exit being along Route 10, which enters through the northernmost portion of Gill before it crosses the Connecticut River over the Bennett's Meadow Bridge. The Route 10 bridge is the only active car bridge within town; the smaller Schell Bridge lies inactive (since 1985) near the Vermont state line, and the old Vermont & Massachusetts Rail Bridge lies between them. For 2.5 miles (4.0 km), Route 10 shares a concurrency with Route 63, which passes from neighboring Erving to the south into Hinsdale to the north. Route 10 also passes into New Hampshire and the town of Winchester, as it heads north towards nearby Keene. Additionally, most of Route 142 passes through the town towards Vernon, Vermont, and nearby Brattleboro.

The Amtrak Vermonter line passes through the town daily, offering train service between many of the cities along the Eastern Seaboard. However, it no longer stops at Northfield (the nearest stops are in Greenfield and Brattleboro) and there is no other public transportation within town. The nearest private airport is Turners Falls Airport in nearby Montague, with the nearest national air service being 65 miles (105 km) south at Bradley International Airport in Connecticut. The town has a boat ramp near Schell Bridge.

It is one of only four towns on the Connecticut River that is on both sides of the river; the others are Pittsburg, New Hampshire, Wethersfield, Connecticut, and Haddam, Connecticut.

== Demographics ==
Historical population
Year	Pop.	±%
1790	868	—
1840	1,658	+91.0%
1850	1,772	+6.9%
1860	1,712	−3.4%
1870	1,720	+0.5%
1880	1,603	−6.8%
1890	1,869	+16.6%
1900	1,966	+5.2%
1910	1,642	−16.5%
1920	1,775	+8.1%
1930	1,888	+6.4%
1940	1,975	+4.6%
1950	2,246	+13.7%
1960	2,320	+3.3%
1970	2,631	+13.4%
1980	2,386	−9.3%
1990	2,838	+18.9%
2000	2,951	+4.0%
2010	3,032	+2.7%
2020	2,866	−5.5%
2022	2,872	+0.2%
Source: United States census records and Population Estimates Program data.

As of the census of 2000, there had been 2,951 people, 1,158 households, and 815 families residing in the town. The population density was 85.8 inhabitants per square mile (33.1/km^{2}). There were 1,262 housing units at an average density of 36.7 per square mile (14.2/km^{2}). The racial makeup of the town was 98.51% White, 0.10% Black or African American, 0.20% Native American, 0.20% Asian, 0.03% from other races, and 0.95% from two or more races. Hispanic or Latino of any race were 0.58% of the population.

There were 1,158 households, out of which 34.1% had children under the age of 18 living with them, 57.4% were married couples living together, 9.1% had a female householder with no husband present, and 29.6% were non-families. Of all households, 25.2% were made up of individuals, and 10.5% had someone living alone who was 65 years of age or older. The average household size was 2.53 and the average family size was 3.04.

In the town, the population's age was spread out, with 26.3% under the age of 18, 6.3% from 18 to 24, 27.5% from 25 to 44, 26.4% from 45 to 64, and 13.5% who were 65 years of age or older. The median age was 40 years. For every 100 females, there were 92.2 males. For every 100 females age 18 and over, there were 89.5 males.

The median income for a household in the town was $49,141, and the median income for a family was $56,816. Males had a median income of $40,396 versus $28,615 for females. The per capita income for the town was $21,517. About 3.6% of families and 5.0% of the population were below the poverty line, including 4.6% of those under age 18 and 9.1% of those age 65 or over.

== Notable people ==
- Henry J. Hosmer, 19th-century president of the American Powder Mills and member of the Massachusetts General Court
- James Kendall Hosmer, Civil War Union soldier, president of the American Library Association, prolific writer and historian of the American Civil War
- Jonathan Hunt, second Lieutenant Governor of Vermont and a member of the prominent Hunt family of Vermont
- D.L. Moody, evangelist and publisher connected with Keswickianism, who founded the Moody Church

== Government ==
The town is governed by a five-member select board, charged with the creation and enforcement of policy and general decision-making, among other responsibilities. The town is part of the 2nd Franklin District in the Massachusetts House of Representatives, represented by Susannah Whipps, and the Hampshire, Franklin and Worcester Senate district, represented by Jo Comerford.

== Points of interest ==
- King Philip's Hill
- Linden Hill School (defunct)
- Northfield Chateau (no longer existent)
- Northfield Drive-In Movie Theater
- Northfield Mount Hermon School
- Northfield Mountain
- Pioneer Valley Regional School
- Schell Bridge
- Thomas Aquinas College
