= Soule (disambiguation) =

Soule is a former viscounty and French province and part of the present-day Pyrénées-Atlantiques département.

Soule may also refer to:

== Surname or given name ==
- Abdou Soulé Elbak (1954 –), president of the autonomous island of Grande Comore
- Augustus Soule (1827–1887), justice of the Massachusetts Supreme Judicial Court
- Charles Soule, American comic book writer
- Charles Carroll Soule, American bookseller
- Chris Soule (1973 –), American skeleton racer
- Christophe Soulé (1951 –), French mathematician
- George Soule (educator) (1834–1926), Louisiana author, educator, and soldier
- George Soulé (industrialist) (1849–1922), founder of the Soulé Steam Feed Works
- George Soule (Mayflower passenger) (c. 1602–1677/80)
- George Soulé (musician) (born 1945), American songwriter, musician and record producer
- George Henry Soule Jr. (1887–1970), labor economist and editor for the New Republic
- Jared Taylor Soule (born 1989), music producer known professionally as Full Tac
- Jeremy Soule (1975 –), American video game music composer
- Joshua Soule (1781 – 1867), American bishop
- Maris Soule (1939 –), American author
- Matías Soulé (2003 –), Argentine professional footballer
- Michael E. Soulé, American biologist
- Mickey Lee Soule (1946 –), American keyboardist
- Nathan Soule, American politician from New York
- Olan Soule (1909 – 1994), actor
- Pierre Soulé (1801 – 1870), American politician
- Ricardo Soulé (1950 – 2026), Argentine musician, lead vocalist of Vox Dei
- Richard Soule (1966 –), Australian cricketer
- Samuel W. Soulé, American inventor
- Silas Soule (1838 – 1865), U.S. Army Captain in the American Civil War, and whistleblower of the Sand Creek Massacre
- Soulé (singer), Irish R&B and pop singer-songwriter
- Taylor Soule (born 2000), American basketball player

== Other ==
- La soule, a team sport
- Soulé Steam Feed Works, a business in Meridian, Mississippi
- Soule University (Texas) and Soule College (Tennessee), named for Methodist bishop Joshua Soule
- Soule College in Kansas (Presbyterian)
- Soule Business College in New Orleans, Louisiana from 1856 to 1983

== See also ==
- Soul (disambiguation)
- Soules, a surname
