= George Soule =

George Soule or Soulé may refer to:

- George Soule (Mayflower passenger) (c. 1602–1677/80), colonist
- George Soulé (industrialist) (1849–1922), founder of the Soulé Steam Feed Works
- George Soulé (musician) (born 1945), American songwriter, musician and record producer
- George Henry Soule Jr. (1887–1970), labor economist and editor for the New Republic
- George Soule (educator) (1834–1926), Louisiana author, educator, and soldier
