= Soul (disambiguation) =

A soul is the incorporeal essence of a living being.

Soul(s) may also refer to:

== Arts and entertainment ==
=== Film ===
- Dusha (lit. Soul), a 1981 Soviet film
- Soul (2013 film), a Taiwanese film
- Roh (film), a 2019 Malaysian horror film
- Soul (2020 film), an American animated film
- The Soul (film), a 2021 Chinese/Taiwanese film

=== Literature ===
- Soul (novel), a 1935 novella by Andrey Platonov
- On the Soul by Aristotle
- "Souls" (story), a 1982 novella by Joanna Russ
- The Soul, announced sequel to the 2008 science fiction romance novel The Host by Stephenie Meyer

=== Music ===
- Soul music, a genre
- Soul (publication), a newspaper focusing on Soul music

==== Artists ====
- Souls (band), a Bangladeshi rock band
- Sounds of Unity and Love, a 1970s American funk band
- Soul, a member of the band Superorganism

==== Albums ====
- Soul (Eric Church album), 2021
- Soul (Coleman Hawkins album), 1958
- Soul (The Kentucky Headhunters album), 2003
- Soul (Lena Horne album), 1966
- Soul (Ray Bryant album), 1965
- Soul (Ravenhill album) or the title song, 2015
- Soul (Seal album), 2008
- Soul (soundtrack), from the 2020 film

==== Songs ====
- "Soul" (song), by Lee Brice from Hey World, 2022
- "Soul", by Celine Dion from Courage, 2019
- "Soul", by Gen Hoshino from Yellow Dancer, 2015
- "Soul", by Girls' Generation from Mr.Mr., 2014
- "Soul", by Manabu Oshio, 2002
- "Soul", by Matchbox Twenty from More Than You Think You Are, 2002

=== Television shows ===
- Soul (Canadian TV series), a 2009 dramatic miniseries
- Soul (South Korean TV series), a 2009 crime horror series
- Soul!, a 1970s American public television program

== Television and radio ==
- BET Soul, originally VH1 Soul, an American pay television network
- Fox Soul, a streaming digital television network
- NPO Soul & Jazz, a Dutch radio station

== People ==
- David Soul (1943–2024), American actor and singer
- Joseph Soul (1805–1881), British reformer
- Maelcum Soul (1940–1968), American artist, artist's model, and actress

== Other uses ==
- Philadelphia Soul, an Arena Football League team
- Kia Soul, an automobile by Kia Motors
- Soul (building), a residential tower on the Gold Coast, Queensland, Australia
- Soul theorem, in mathematics, a result in Riemannian geometry
- Soul, in aeronautical phraseology, a living person on board an aircraft
- Soul, an Australian telecommunications company merged into TPG
- Soul, a unit of account for measuring numbers of serfs in Imperial Russia
- Soul, the comprehensive self-identified attributes that form the culture (e.g., Soul music, Soul food, etc.) of African-Americans

== See also ==
- Seoul (disambiguation)
- Seven souls (disambiguation)
- Sol (disambiguation)
- Sole (disambiguation)
- Soul food (disambiguation)
- Soul Song (disambiguation)
- Soule (disambiguation)
- Soules, a surname
