= Sole =

Sole may refer to:

== Common meanings ==
- Sole (foot), the bottom of the foot
- Sole (shoe), the bottom supporting member of the shoe

== Fish ==
- Sole (fish), one of several species and groups of flatfishes:
- Soleidae, the family of the "true soles"
  - Solea solea, the common or Dover sole, used in European cooking
- American sole, the family Achiridae
- Tonguefish, or tongue sole, in the family Cynoglossidae
- Several species of righteye flounder in the family Pleuronectidae:
  - Lemon sole
  - Microstomus pacificus (Pacific Dover sole)

== People ==
- Sole (surname)
- Solé (surname), a French and Spanish surname
- Sole (hip hop artist) (born 1977), hip-hop emcee and co-founder of the Anticon record label
- Solé (born 1973), American rapper and former wife of R&B singer Ginuwine

== Other uses ==
- Sole (currency), a 19th-century Argentine and Bolivian currency
- European Liberal Social Democracy (Italian: Socialdemocrazia Liberale Europea), a defunct political party in Italy
- Sole Bank, a sand bank in the Atlantic Ocean to the southwest of Cornwall, England
- Sole (film), a 2019 Italian-Polish drama film
- Sun (film) (Italian: Sole), a 1929 silent Italian film
- Sole Technology, an American footwear company specializing in skateboarding shoes
- Radio Sole, a former independent local radio station based in Galatina, Lecce, Italy
- Sole, the flat bottom part of plane that slides along the workpiece
- Sole, a part of a tool such as a spokeshave

== See also ==
- Corporation sole, in English law, a legal entity consisting of a single ("sole") person
- Sole proprietorship, a business which legally has no separate existence from its owner
- Seoul, the capital of South Korea
- Soles (disambiguation)
- Sol (disambiguation)
- Sola (disambiguation)
- Soul (disambiguation)
- Soules, a surname
