= Soulful =

Soulful may refer to:

- The quality of "having soul", often used in the context of a performer or work of soul music
- Soulful (Dionne Warwick album), 1969
- Soulful (Ruben Studdard album), 2003
- "Soulful" (song), by Justin Bieber and Druski, 2025

== See also ==
- Soul (disambiguation)
