= Helen Flanders =

Helen Flanders may refer to:

- Helen Hartness Flanders (1890–1972), American folklorist and ballad collector
- Helen Flanders Dunbar (1902–1959), American psychiatrist
