= Seoul (disambiguation) =

Seoul is the capital and largest city of South Korea.

Seoul may also refer to:

- Seoul Capital Area, the metropolitan area of Seoul
- FC Seoul, a South Korean professional football club
- Seoul Street, a street in Tehran, Iran

== Songs ==
- "Seoul" (song), by Amiina, 2006
- "Seoul City" (song), by Jennie, 2025
- "Seoul", by Girls' Generation and Super Junior, 2009
- "Seoul", by Lee Hyori from Black, 2017
- "Seoul", by RM from Mono, 2018

== See also ==
- Seul (disambiguation)
- Soul (disambiguation)
- Sole (disambiguation)
