= Souls (disambiguation) =

Souls are consciousnesses unique to particular living beings.

Souls may also refer to:

- Souls (band), a Bangladeshi rock music group
- The Souls, a social group

== See also ==
- Soul (disambiguation)
- Soules, a surname
