= Soules =

Soules is a surname. Notable people with the surname include:

- Chris Soules (born 1981), American reality television personality and farmer
- Dale Soules (born 1946), American actress
- Merrie Lee Soules, Democratic candidate for the 2016 US House of Representatives election for New Mexico's 2nd congressional district
- Olivier Soules (born 1967), French tennis player
- William Soules (born 1955), American politician

== See also ==
- Soules (automobile), automotive company founded in Grand Rapids, Michigan in 1905
- Soules College of Business at the University of Texas at Tyler
- William II de Soules (d. 1320/1321), Lord of Liddesdale and Butler of Scotland
- John de Soules (disambiguation)
- Soule (disambiguation)
- Souls (disambiguation)
- Soles (disambiguation)
