= Seul =

Seul may refer to:

- French for solitude or loneliness
- Seoul, the capital and largest city of South Korea
- Seul, Korean name for the Se (instrument), an ancient Chinese musical instrument
- Lac Seul, a lake in Ontario, Canada
- Lac Seul First Nation, an Indian reserve on the shores of Lac Seul
- Seul (album) (2000), by Canadian singer Garou
- Seul (film) (1932), a Jean Tarride film starring René Lefèvre
- "Seul" (song) (2000), by Canadian singer Garou
- SEUL, a Linux advocacy group

== See also ==
- Seoul (disambiguation)
- Seul Choix Light, a lighthouse located in the northwest corner of Lake Michigan in Schoolcraft County, Michigan
- Seul contre tous, a 1998 French film by Gaspar Noé
