= Ravenhill (band) =

American rock band

RAVENHILL
- Origin: Southern Illinois
- Genres: Alternative rock, soul, Southern rock
- Years active: 2009–present
- Label: HONEY GOLD RECORDS
- Members: Joshua Clifton; Kalen Orr; Brady Clifton; Logan Gavaldon
- Past members: Keith Schaubert; David Curtis; Dane Johns; Aaron Broach; Taylor Chance; Coleman Fitch; Dane Johns; Jonathan Raby; Kyle Hassenfratz; Mike Bay; NIGHT RAINBOW SUPERMOON
- Website: ravenhillband.com

RAVENHILL is an American rock band. They are originally from southern Illinois relocated to Nashville, Tennessee, but now reside near the Dallas, Texas, area. The band started making music in 2009. Their membership is Joshua Clifton, Brady Clifton, Kalen Orr, & Logan Gavaldon with former members Dane Johns, Aaron Broach, Keith Schaubert, Coleman Fitch, Dane Johns (Sleeping Tapes, alliswell), David Curtis (Run Kid Run, SideWalkSlam), Kyle Hassenfratz, Taylor Chance, and Jonathan Raby. The band released an album, Ladies and Gentlemen, I Present To You..., independently in 2009. Their next release, the EP Live on Delmar, was released independently in 2010. They released a second extended play, Lions, in 2011, also independently. Their first studio album, Soul, was released by Slospeak Records in 2015. They released an EP called “Spirit” on Honey Gold Records in 2018. Later on August 3 in the same year, RAVENHILL released “Midnight Gold” on Honey Gold Records.

== Background ==
Ravenhill, which is named after Leonard Ravenhill, is a Southern rock band from southern Illinois around West Frankfort and Herrin. In 2010, the band moved to Nashville, Tennessee, and signed to indie record label Slospeak Records. Their members are vocalist and guitarist Joshua Clifton, guitarists Taylor Chance and Mike Bay, bassist Brady Clifton, and drummer Kyle Hassenfratz, with their former members guitarist Dan Johns and drummers Coleman Fitch and Jonathan Raby, the latter also performing background vocals for the group.

== Music history ==
The band commenced as a musical entity in 2009 with their first release, Ladies and Gentlemen, I Present To You..., an independently released album. They released an extended play, Live on Delmar, independently in 2010. The subsequent release, yet another extended play, Lions, was released independently on May 20, 2011. Their first studio album, Soul, was released on March 24, 2015, from Slospeak Records. The single "Mercy" hit to No. 20 on the Billboard magazine Christian rock chart.

== Members ==
=== Current members ===
- Joshua Clifton – lead vocals, guitar
- Kalen Orr - Guitar, Backing Vocals, Producer
- Brady Clifton – bass, background vocals
- Logan Gavaldon – drums

=== Former members ===
- Mike Bay – guitar
- Taylor Chance – guitar
- Coleman Fitch – drums
- Dane Johns – guitar
- Jon Raby – drums, background vocals
- Chris Goode – drums
- Aaron Broach – keys
- David Curtis – guitar
- Jeremy Jackson – bass
- Kyle Hassenfratz – drums

== Discography ==
=== Studio albums ===
- Ladies and Gentlemen, I Present To You... (2009, independent)
- Soul (March 24, 2015, Slospeak)

=== EPs ===
- Live on Delmar (2010, independent)
- Lions (May 20, 2011, independent)
- Merry Christmas Ya Filthy Animals(LIVE & RAW) (December 10, 2021, Honey Gold Records)

=== Singles ===
Year	Single	Chart Positions
Year	Single	US Chr Rock
2015	"Mercy"	20
