= Regina Jones =

American publisher and former editor Soul Newspaper

Regina Jones (née Nickerson; born September 23, 1942) is a publisher and writer, who was the co-owner of Soul.

== Career ==
Regina Jones was born September 23, 1942, and grew up in South Los Angeles. She married Ken Jones when she was 15, after they'd met as students at Fremont High School in South Los Angeles.

In 1965, Jones was working as a LAPD dispatcher. She later recalled taking distress calls from what would become known as the Watts riots. It was while watching the riots on television that she and her husband decided they needed to do something for Black people, and founded Soul, a music newspaper celebrating Black music. By 1967, Soul had gained popularity and Jones quit her LAPD job to work for the newspaper where she became editor-in-chief. Due to her work on Soul, Jones received the NAACP Image Award for Outstanding Woman In Business in 1980.

Soul was published by the Joneses bi-weekly, and in 1978 they followed it up with another publication focused on Black communities in Los Angeles, The Los Angeles Spirit. This was published weekly, and was printing 15,000 copies within its first 12 weeks, but closed down within one year.

After Soul closed in 1982, Jones became VP of publicity for Dick Griffey at SOLAR Records. She then founded Regina Jones & Associates, a PR firm whose clients included Geffen Records and Capitol Records.

She is the subject of the 2024 documentary film Who in the Hell Is Regina Jones?, which was co-directed by Billy Miossi and Soraya Sélène. The film made its debut at the American Black Film Festival in June 2024, and has been shown at other festivals since.

== Awards and honors ==
In February 2025, Jones was awarded the Trailblazer Award by GreenLight Women for her work at Soul.
