= Sole (surname) =

Sole is a surname. Notable people with the surname include:

- Alfred Sole (1943–2022), American production designer, film director, producer and writer
- Anil Sole (born 1959), Indian politician
- Catherine Sole (born 1978), South African entomologist
- Chris Sole (born 1994), Scottish cricketer
- Christian Sole (1896–1980), Norwegian politician
- David Sole (born 1962), Scottish rugby union player
- Fabio Sole (born 2001), English footballer
- Jonathan Sole (born 1987), New Zealand cricketer
- Josh Sole (born 1980), New Zealand-born rugby union player
- William Sole (1739–1802), British apothecary and botanist

== See also ==
- Solé (surname)
