= Ken Jones (news reporter) =

American reporter (1938–1993)

- Born: Kenneth Leon Jones; June 9, 1938; Los Angeles, California, U.S.
- Died: May 13, 1993 (aged 54); Los Angeles, California, U.S.
- Occupations: Television news reporter, News anchor, Radio host, Publisher, Actor
- Years active: 1954's–1988
- Notable credit(s): Longtime anchorman for KTTV-TV, Los Angeles

Kenneth Leon Jones (June 9, 1938 – May 13, 1993) was an American television journalist, actor, reporter and news anchor. He was Los Angeles television's first black weeknight news anchor, working for Los Angeles television station KTTV-TV channel 11 and KNXT channel 2 (now known as KCBS-TV). Jones was known for his reports on the 1965 Watts riots and the assassination of Sen. Robert F. Kennedy in 1968. Ken Jones also conceived and published, along with his wife Regina Jones, SOUL, a black entertainment newsmagazine, from 1966-82. In 1992, Ken was diagnosed with bladder cancer and after a short battle with the disease, died in May 1993.

== Background ==
The oldest of three children, Ken was born to Georgia Wood Jones and Henry Leon Jones in Los Angeles, California. He graduated from John C. Fremont High school in Los Angeles. He married Regina Nickerson in 1958. Regina is the granddaughter of William Nickerson Jr., co-founder of Golden State Mutual Life Insurance Company. Together Ken and Regina Jones had four sons, Kenneth, Jr., Kevin, Keith, Kory, and one daughter Karen. In 1992, Jones was diagnosed with bladder cancer and after a short battle with the disease, died in May 1993.

== Career ==
He was hired as a reporter for the Los Angeles Herald-Examiner Newspaper in 1954. He became a disc jockey at KBCA and KGFJ radio and a news director for KDAY radio in L.A. in 1962. He worked as a production assistant for the West Coast edition of the Huntley-Brinkley Report from 1963-65 which he left to become a regular newscaster for KRLA radio in Pasadena, a position he held until 1967 when he was hired as a feature reporter, then was promoted to weeknight Anchor at KTTV-TV in Los Angeles where he received an Emmy Award for a one-hour news special, The High Cost of Health Care May Be Hazardous To Your Health. His growing prominence led to numerous TV and film roles including The Candidate (1972) and The Brady Bunch (1972) (TV). Ken worked as a reporter and weekend anchor at KNXT, now KCBS-TV Los Angeles, in 1980.

== Film and television acting career ==
Jones appeared in many shows throughout the 1970's and 1980's.

== Filmography ==
- "The Candidate" - himself (1972)
- "Roman Polanski: Wanted and Desired" - himself (Archive Footage) (2008)

== Television work (actor) ==
- "The Brady Bunch" The Liberation of Marcia Brady - Newscaster (1971)
- "McMillan & Wife" - Newscaster 3 episodes (1972–1974)
- "Police Woman" - Newscaster (1977)
- "The Young Runaways" - Mike Carruthers (1978)
- "Matt Houston" - reporter (1983)
