= Soles =

Soles may refer to:

== People ==
- Caro Soles, Canadian author
- Henry Soles Jr. (1935–2018), American minister
- Linden Soles (born 1956), Canadian journalist
- Michael Soles (1966–2021), Canadian football player
- P. J. Soles, American actress
- Paul Soles (1930–2021), Canadian voice actor
- R. C. Soles Jr. (1934–2021), American politician
- Steven Soles, American musician

== Sports ==
- Soles de Santo Domingo Este, a professional basketball team based in Santo Domingo Este, Santo Domingo, Dominican Republic
- Soles de Mexicali, a professional basketball team based in Mexicali, Baja California, Mexico
- Soles de Sonora, a professional indoor soccer franchise based in Hermosillo, Sonora, Mexico

== Other uses ==
- Soles, Virginia, United States, an unincorporated community

== See also ==
- Sole (disambiguation)
