= Soule Business College =

Former New Orleans educational institution

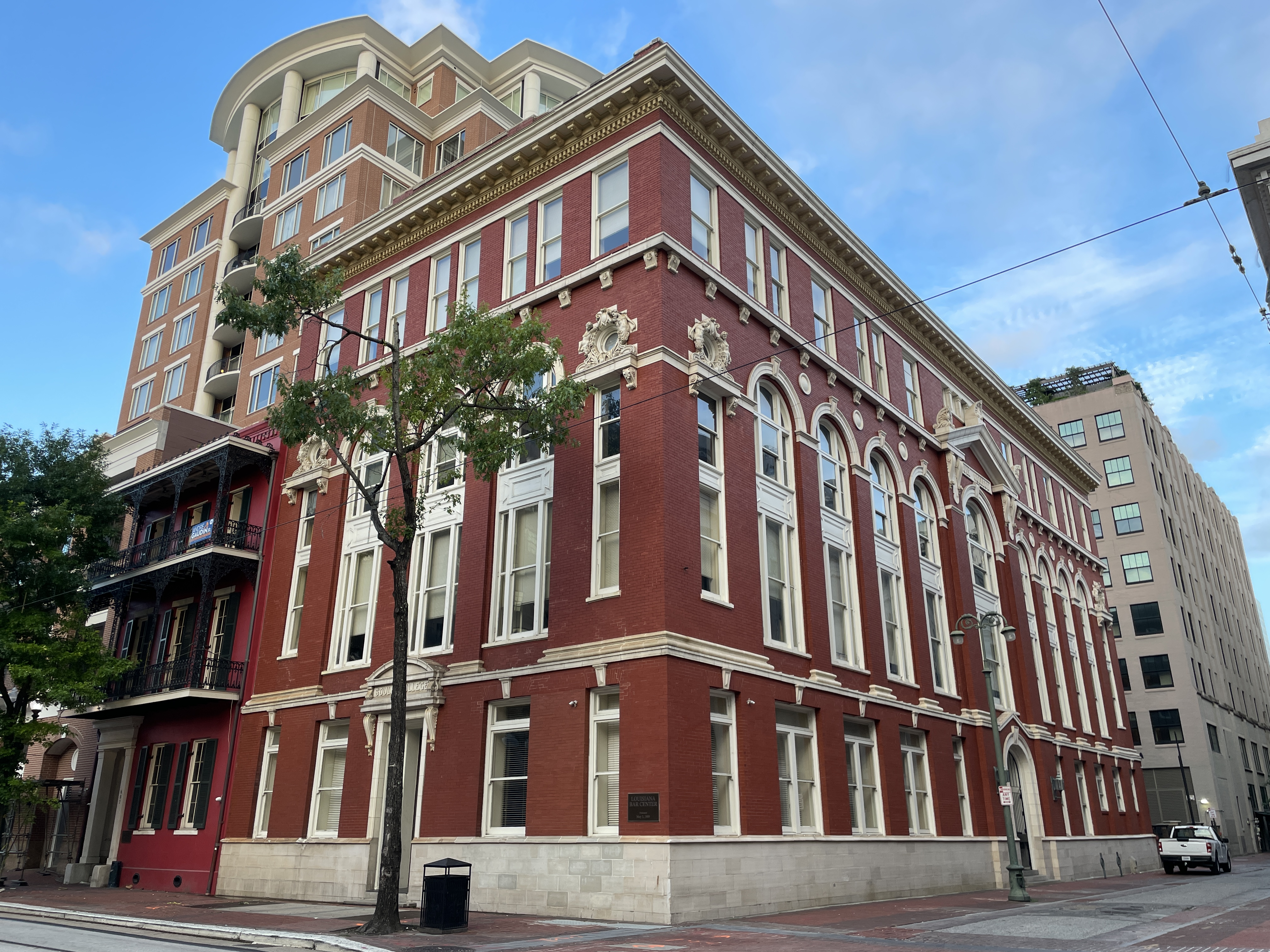
- Soule Business College building in 2026
- Type: Educational institution
- Active: 1856–1983
- Founder: George Soule
- Students: max. 40,000 (1922)
- Location: New Orleans, Louisiana, United States

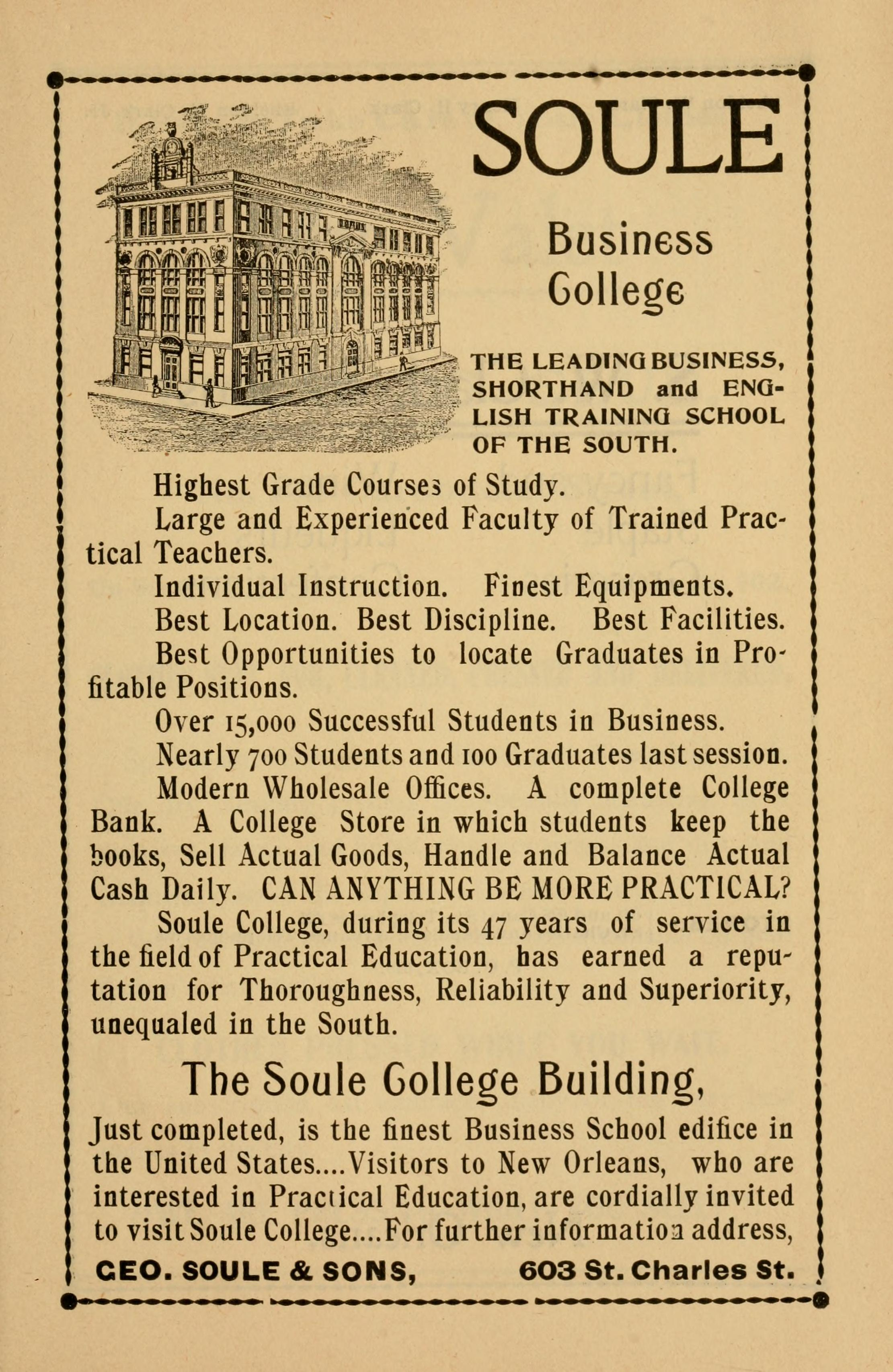
1902 advertisement for Soule Business College

Soule Business College (sometimes called Soulé's Business College, Soule Commercial College, or Soule College) was an American educational institution focused primary on practical business skills, established by educator George Soule in New Orleans, Louisiana in 1856, and operating until 1983.

== History ==
The college was founded in 1856 by George Soule, and was originally located on Camp Street at Common. The school "taught skills useful in the business world", with classes on typing, shorthand, and bookkeeping, as well as other skills useful for those looking to work in venues like banks and department stores. At the time of its establishment, "neither in the North nor in the South did people generally attach much importance to so-called practical education, the training of youth for business and the serious work of life".

From its foundation, Soule College was in continuous operation except for the two or three years when the school was closed during the American Civil War, and George Soule was serving as an officer in the Confederate States Army. After the war, Soule returned to New Orleans to find his school property destroyed or confiscated, but undertook to rebuild the school.

The school later moved to St. Charles Avenue, next to Gallier Hall across from Lafayette Square. Soule ran ads for the school in many Louisiana newspapers, including the St. Mary Banner, the Lafayette Advertiser, and The Natchitoches Enterprise, and even in Mississippi papers like The East Mississippi Times, and The Mississippi Union Advocate and Southern Farm and Home. A 1905 Lafayette Advertiser piece said of the school, "[i]ts popularity grows with the years, and last session the record was broken in number of teachers, number of students and number of graduates", with the school then having over 1,000 current students, 20 teachers, and over 19,000 former students.

By 1910, it was described as "one of the leading educational institutions in the state", with over twenty-three thousand pupils having been taught there, and by 1922, Soule College was reported to have enrolled upwards of forty thousand students. Soule taught many classes himself on a variety of subjects, particularly in the areas of mathematics, philosophy, and logic. He was described as "well known to every young man in New Orleans, and to educators north and south", and the school was described as "one of the comparatively few schools that have completely and successfully realized the broad purposes of the founder".

In 1923 the school moved one last time to its final location on Jackson Avenue, in the Garden District.

George Soule died in 1926, at which time it was noted that Soule College was "probably the oldest institution of its type in the South". The school continued after Soule's death, until it finally closed in 1983.

== Notable alumni ==
- Jimmie Davis, singer/songwriter and Governor of Louisiana
- Walter B. Hamlin, Justice of the Louisiana Supreme Court
- Henry E. Hardtner, Louisiana businessman and conservationist
- Thomas C. McRae, U.S. Representative and Governor of Arkansas
- Robert Maestri, Mayor of New Orleans
- Herman Lee Meader, American architect and author
- Jeremiah Joseph O'Keefe, World War II ace fighter pilot and Mississippi politician
- J. Emile Verret, Lieutenant Governor of Louisiana
- Hugh L. White, Governor of Mississippi

== Attribution ==
Content in this article was adapted from Ellen Terrell, Soulé’s Business College – Practical Business Education for over 120 years, Library of Congress (June 1, 2018), a source in the public domain.
