= Soul (Ravenhill album) =

Studio album by Ravenhill
- Released: March 24, 2015
- Genre: Christian alternative rock, soul, Southern rock
- Length: 36:35
- Label: Slospeak

Soul is the first studio album by Ravenhill. Slospeak Records released the album on March 24, 2015.

== Critical reception ==
Professional ratings
Review scores
Source	Rating
Confront Magazine	4.5/5 stars
Indie Vision Music	4/5 stars
Jesus Freak Hideout	4/5 stars

Awarding the album four stars from Jesus Freak Hideout, Scott Fryberger states, " It was a strong album then, and it's even better now." Scott Swan, rating the album four stars for Indie Vision Music, writes, "This record remarkably melds music from a by-gone era into something surprisingly invigorating. This music is real." Giving the album four and a half stars at Confront Magazine, Candra Miller says, "This whole album is great".

== Track listing ==
Soul
No.	Title	Length
1.	"You'll Go Far Boy"	3:09
2.	"Witches"	4:38
3.	"Devil's Son"	3:01
4.	"The Thrill"	3:19
5.	"Mercy"	4:04
6.	"Six Feet in the Ground"	3:10
7.	"Wicked Man"	2:50
8.	"Soul"	3:53
9.	"Den of Thieves"	3:38
10.	"Blood on the Church Floor"	4:57
Total length:		36:35
