= Soul (publication) =

Music publication based in USA (1966–1982)

SOUL
- Categories: music
- Founder: Ken Jones, Cecil Tuck
- Founded: 1966
- First issue: 14 April 1966
- Final issue Number: May/June 1982; 373
- Country: USA
- Website: soulpublications.co

Soul (sometimes stylised SOUL and alternatively known as SOUL Newspaper) was an American publication that focused on soul music and other music by African Americans. It was published between 1966 and 1982.

== History ==
Soul was founded in 1966 by Ken Jones and Cecil Tuck and initially sold weekly for 15 cents. The first issue, published 14 April 1966, featured James Brown and Mick Jagger on the cover with the headline “White Artists Selling Negro ‘Soul.’” 10,000 copies of the first issue were sold.

Cecil Tuck was bought out in 1967, with Ken Jones and his wife Regina taking ownership and publishing Soul from their home in Los Angeles. They also shifted from publishing 8 pages weekly, to 16 pages twice each month. As part of an expansion, different editions of Soul were published across the US, with charts and advertisements provided by local black radio stations and DJs. This led to a peak of publishing 127,000 copies.

Editors included Regina Jones, Leonard Pitts, and J. Randy Taraborrelli. Other staff included photographers Bruce W. Talamon, Bobby Holland, Erik Whitaker, and Howard Bingham, and writers Mike Terry, Connie Johnson, and Rochelle Smith.

Fifteen issues of Soul Illustrated were also published as a spin-off publication between 1968 – 1972, with up to 60 full color pages.

Soul closed in 1982, with the final issue #373 published May/June 1982 and featuring Jayne Kennedy on the cover. The Soul archives were donated to University of California, Los Angeles and Indiana University in 2010, and were digitised by Matt Jones, grandson of co-founder Ken Jones, and made available online in 2023.

== See also ==
- Jet
- Ebony
- Right On!
