= Soules (automobile) =

Automobile manufacturer

Soules Motor Car Company
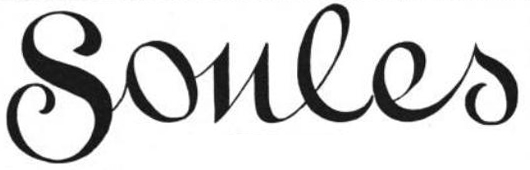
- Company type: Automobile Manufacturing
- Industry: Automotive
- Genre: Touring Cars and Commercial Cars
- Founded: 1905
- Defunct: 1908
- Headquarters: Grand Rapids, Michigan, United States
- Area served: United States
- Products: Vehicles; Automotive parts

The Soules Motor Car Company was founded in 1905 in Grand Rapids, Michigan. They were manufacturers of Soules automobiles and light delivery trucks until 1908.

== Advertisements ==
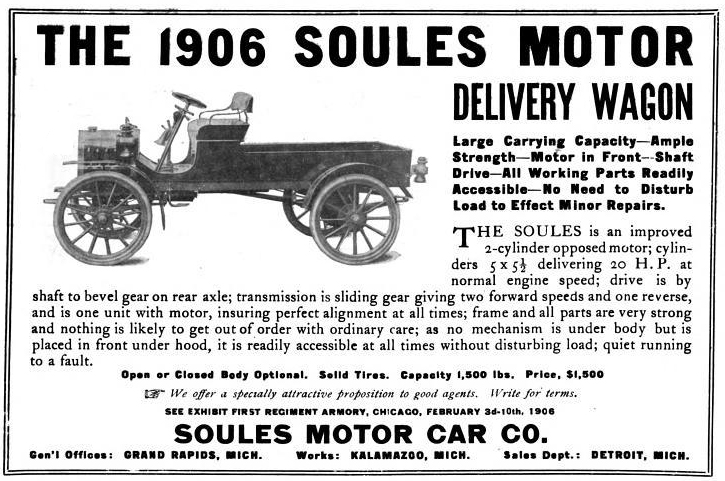
Soules Motor Car Company of Grand Rapids, Michigan - 1905

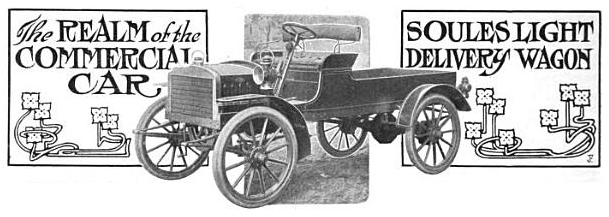
Soules Motor Car Company of Grand Rapids, Michigan - Commercial Wagons - 1906

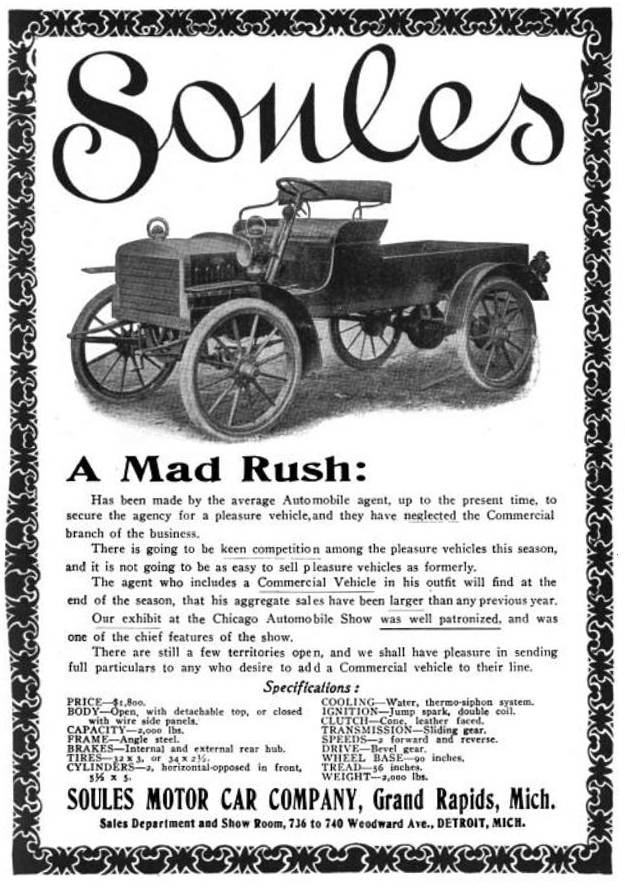
Soules Motor Car Company of Grand Rapids, Michigan - 1906
