= Soul Song (disambiguation) =

"Soul Song" is a 1972 song recorded by Joe Stampley, recorded by other artists.

Soul Song may also refer to:

- Soul Song (Shirley Scott album), 1968, or the title song
- Soul Song, a 1973 album by Joe Stampley
- Soul Song (Archie Shepp album), 1982, or the title song
- "Soul Song", a song by Connie Smith from the 1973 album A Lady Named Smith
