= John de Soules =

John de Soules (or de Soulis or Soules) may relate to:

- John de Soules (Guardian of Scotland) was Guardian of Scotland from 1301 to 1304, at a crucial period in the Wars of Scottish Independence, died in 1310 while in exile in France.
- John de Soules (died 1318) was a compatriot of Robert the Bruce, accompanying Edward Bruce to Ireland and was slain during the Battle of Dundalk on 5 October 1318.
