= Helen Flanders Dunbar =

American psychiatrist

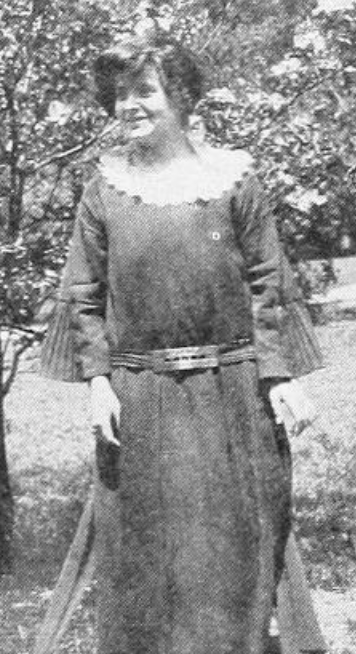
- Helen Dunbar, from the 1923 Bryn Mawr College yearbook
- Born: May 14, 1902; Chicago, Illinois
- Died: August 21, 1959 (aged 57)
- Occupation: Psychiatrist
- Spouses: Theodor Peter Wolfensberger, George Henry Soule Jr.

Helen Flanders Dunbar (May 14, 1902 – August 21, 1959) — later known as H. Flanders Dunbar — is an important early figure in U.S. psychosomatic medicine and psychobiology, as well as being an important advocate of physicians and clergy co-operating in their efforts to care for the sick. She viewed the patient as a combination of the psyche and soma, body and soul. Both needed to be treated in order to treat a patient efficiently. Dunbar received degrees in mathematics, psychology, theology, philosophy, and medicine. Dunbar founded the American Psychosomatic Society in 1942 and was the first editor of its journal. In addition to running several other committees committed to treating the whole patient, Dunbar wrote and distributed information for public health, involving child development and advocating for mental health care after World War II.

== Life ==
Helen Flanders Dunbar, the eldest child of a well-to-do family, born in Chicago, Illinois on May 14, 1902. Her father, Francis William Dunbar (1868–1939), was an electrical engineer, mathematician, and patent attorney. Her mother, Edith Vaughn Flanders (1871–1963), was a professional genealogist and translator. Her brother, Francis, was born in 1906.

As a child she suffered from malnutrition; and despite Dunbar's later misleading claims that she had suffered poliomyelitis, and a childhood pediatrician's diagnosis of a muscular form of rickets ("rachitic pseudo-paralysis"). Due to her illness, Dunbar was described as an intense and nervous child. It is possible that she suffered a form of melancholia at age 15.

At age twelve, Dunbar and her family moved to Manchester, Vermont as a result of her father's involvement in a serious patient litigation. Dunbar was strongly influenced by her mother, her grandmother and her aunt. Her mother was the head of household and an ardent feminist. Dunbar's grandmother, Sarah Ide Flanders, was a widow of an Episcopal priest. Her aunt, Ellen Ide Flanders, once expressed interest in becoming a medical missionary. Many of her characteristics; shrewd, manipulative, stubborn, and domineering, were later also used to describe Helen. Dunbar was also influenced by her father. She was very introverted and highly gifted, mirroring her father's shy and semi-reclusive nature. Dunbar was a lifelong Episcopalian with high church inclinations even though she was largely non-practicing in her later years.

A diminutive adult — she was 4 ft 11 in (150 cm) — she always wore platform shoes. While at Yale, her classmates dubbed her with the nickname "Pocket Minerva", due to her small stature and large accomplishments.

She married her first husband, Theodor Peter Wolfensberger (1902–1954), in 1932 — he was eventually known in the U.S. as Theodore P. Wolfe — and they were divorced in 1939. (Wolfe arranged for the immigration of Austrian psychiatrist Wilhelm Reich in 1939, and was the translator of most of Reich's books and articles.)

She married her second husband, economist and editor of The New Republic, George Henry Soule Jr. (1887–1970), in 1940. A daughter, Marcia was born in 1942.

== Education ==
Dunbar was taught by private tutors and at private schools. Her education began at Laboratory School in Chicago. She graduated from Bryn Mawr with a B.A. (dual major in mathematics and psychology) in 1923. She received a Med. Sci D degree from Columbia University in 1935. Dunbar focused on medieval literature and Dante, which impacted her medical practice and therapeutic approaches. While at Columbia University, Dunbar was simultaneously enrolled at Union Theological Seminary. In 1927, Dunbar graduated from Union Theological Seminary, with a degree in theology, and completed her first year at Yale University's Medical School.

At Columbia University, Dunbar was an acknowledged intellectual leader of her class. At Columbia University, she was instrumental in the beginning of consultation-liaison psychiatry. While at Union Theological Seminary, Dunbar was awarded the Travelling Fellowship for the outstanding student and used this opportunity to travel to Europe in 1929 and visit with both Helene Deutsch and Felix Deutsch in Vienna, and with Carl Jung at the Burghölzli, the psychiatric clinic of Zurich University. She also trained with Anton Boisen (1876–1965), a co-founder of the Clinical Pastoral Education Movement, at the Worcester State Hospital in the summer of 1925.

In pursuit of more knowledge in relation to the psychic aspects of healing and disease, she visited Lourdes and a number of other healing shrines in Germany and Austria. While there, Dunbar observed that of the patients vising the shrine, those overcome by hysterical excitement as well as those waiting for a cure were not the ones to leave feeling well. The most successful were those who came with "deep confidence and quiet" to go about their day, helping themselves and others.

== Career and scholarship ==
While at Union Theological Seminary, she met Anton Boisen, who introduced her to a training program at Worcester. Dunbar worked in the department of social work studying symbols and symbolism in schizophrenia. Her friendship with Boisen led to her helping him through his second psychiatric hospitalization and to her instrumental support in his interests in the formal structuring of the movement into the Council for Clinical Training.

Dunbar had a fundamental role in the stages of the clinical pastoral education movement that brought seminarians and clergy into hospitals and clinics for pastoral care and counseling training, but was not actively involved much after the late 1930s. She believed in the importance of clinical training for clergy and the role of symbols in understanding illness. She was the first medical director (1930–1942) of the Council for the Clinical Training of Theological Students in New York City. She was also the director of the Joint Committee on Religion and Medicine of the Federal Council of Churches of Christ in America and the New York Academy of Medicine from 1931 to 1936. She was an instructor at the New York Psychoanalytic Institute from 1941 to 1949. She founded the American Psychosomatic Society in 1942 and was the first editor of its journal Psychosomatic Medicine.

She also had an interest in public health. Dunbar wrote books on childhood development to help parents. She also wrote of her extensive and evangelical efforts to spread the word about the virtues and values of mental health care following the conclusion of World War II.

Dunbar's life and contributions have been studied and documented by multiple scholars, most notably Robert C. Powell, whose dissertation, "Healing and Wholeness: Helen Flanders Dunbar (1902-1959) and an Extra-Medical Origin of the American Psychosomatic Movement, 1906-1936," is the most comprehensive manuscript on her work. As a result of the extensive scholarship that Dunbar has received, both the Association for Clinical Pastoral Education and the College for Pastoral Supervision and Psychotherapy give out annual "Helen Flanders Dunbar (1902-1959) Award for Significant Contributions to the Field of Clinical Pastoral Training" in her honor. Powell described Dunbar as a "practical theoretician" and a "woman with a mission".

== Research and influences ==
Dunbar believed that the psyche and soma, body and soul, were intimately connected and the physician must attend to both if the patient is to be fully healed. She saw the patient in their world first and only then integrated this understanding with symptoms resulting in a diagnosis of disease. She drew upon the foundational work of John Dewey and William James, who saw the patients as human beings who were dynamically involved in an environment that formed and transformed them. She was the first to attempt to do research into the efficacy of pastoral care on the healing process. The results, however, were inconclusive. She was unable to put her substantial learning together in service of the rapidly expanding dialogue between religion and psychiatry.

Dunbar's studies at Columbia University of Dante lead to an "insight symbol", which like symbols in medieval and renaissance literature, in psychosomatic medicine and psychiatry gather, shed light on, or refer to a multiplicity of meanings, events, and conditions. For Dunbar, symbols called attention to the whole that is always greater than the sum of its parts. Dunbar also attempted to extend the use of psychoanalysis into the somatic realm. She suggested a physical mechanism for the psyche that was taken from the first two laws of thermodynamics, which she called "emotional thermodynamics". The first law stated psychological energy seeks an outlet through physical symptoms due to its inability to be expressed mentally. The second law states that permanent faults in personality can lead to dissipation of energy and eventually somatic dysfunction. Dunbar viewed the mind as a tangible entity seeking its own equilibrium, by means of energy flowing from an invisible mind to a tangible body. However, Dunbar's research showed a correlational rather than causational relationship between mental and physical phenomena.

One of Dunbar's case studies was of a man named James Roe, who had impressions of God that contributed to an emotional breakdown. When James was seven, he was a very well behaved young boy. However, his mother suffered financial misfortunes that led to him abandoning his plan for future education. His pastor mentioned the discipline of the Cross and caused James to identify with Christ, the mocked one. James continued to lose one job after another, causing him to face God and memories of his father with a sense of failure. His pastor continued to talk to him about Christ. Once admitted to a mental hospital, he told the superintendent that he was Christ. Dunbar used this case to document the damaging effect of an overarching portrayal of God as the suffering God. She challenged teachers of religion to use dynamic symbolism, which provides multiple symbols that can prevent an overbearing focus on one of them.

Another one of Dunbar's studies involved a study of pregnancy to support her theory of connection between mind and body. It was based on two patients. One of the women had one miscarriage and two stillbirths and the other had a stillborn before delivering a healthy baby girl. Dunbar was convinced that a Freudian analysis of a pregnant patient's dreams could prevent miscarriage and stillbirth. The health of the child was also at risk for "severe emotional strain during pregnancy".

Dunbar believed that psychiatry and medicine could work together to isolate pathogenic factors in disease and be able to prevent them. She and her colleagues sketched out a "cardiac type of personality", a relentlessly driven ambitious male that resembled a "Type A" personality.

== Works ==
- Dunbar, H.F., Emotions and Bodily Changes, Columbia University Press, (New York), 1935.
- Dunbar, H.F., Mind and Body: Psychosomatic Medicine, Random House, (New York), 1947.
- Dunbar, H.F., Psychiatry in the Medical Specialties, McGraw-Hill, (New York), 1959.
- Dunbar, H.F., Psychosomatic Diagnosis, P.B. Hoeber, Inc., (New York), 1943.
- Dunbar, H.F., Symbolism in Medieval Thought and its Consummation in The Divine Comedy, Yale University Press, (New Haven), 1929.
- Dunbar, H.F., Your Child’s Mind and Body; a Practical Guide for Parents, Random House, (New York), 1949.

== Later life and death ==
Towards the end of her life, Dunbar suffered from a self-destructive nature and alcoholism. These attitudes caused her to be removed from her position on the American Psychosomatic Society. She alienated leaders of the Council for Clinical Training for Theological Students. She also lost her position as its medical director after she demanded adherence to her own version of psychoanalytic orthodoxy. A former secretary who was a close friend and a former patient committed suicide. In 1954, she was in a serious automobile accident and was involved in costly ligation with a former patient. On August 21, 1959, Dunbar was found floating face down in her swimming pool. Initial speculations mentioned suicide. However, the coroner recorded a death by drowning. The drowning was most likely caused by a heart attack.
