= Seven souls =

Seven souls may refer to:

- Egyptian soul, a concept with several distinct elements
- (The) Seven Souls, a Los Angeles-based vocal group that included Bob Welch
- Seven Souls, an album by Material, in collaboration with author William S. Burroughs
