= Soul Food =

Soul food is a type of cuisine.

Soul Food may also refer to:

== Motion pictures ==
- Soul Food (film), a 1997 American comedy-drama film
  - Soul Food (soundtrack), the soundtrack to the 1997 film Soul Food
- Soul Food (TV series), an American television drama

== Music ==
- Soul Food (Def Jef album)
- Soul Food (Goodie Mob album)
- Soulfood (Shirley Murdock album), 2007
- Soul Food (Oblivians album)
- Soul Food (Bobby Timmons album), 1966
- ""Soul Food" (song), by Goodie Mob
- "Soul Food", a song by Big K.R.I.T. from his album Cadillactica
- "Soul Food", a song by Cormega from his album The True Meaning
- "Soul Food", a song by Fabolous and Jadakiss from their album Friday on Elm Street
- "Soul Food", a song by Keith Urban from his album The Speed of Now Part 1
- "Soul Food", a song by Logic from his album Under Pressure
- "Soul Food", a song by Sonny Stitt featuring Don Patterson from the album Shangri-La

== See also ==
- Chicken Soup for the Soul
