= George Soule (educator) =

American educator (1834–1926)

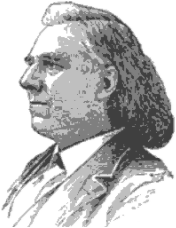
- Born: May 14, 1834; Barrington, New York
- Died: January 26, 1926 (aged 91); New Orleans, Louisiana
- Occupations: Educator, writer, military officer
- Spouse: Mary Jane Reynolds (m. 1860; died 1918)
- Children: 9

George Soule (sometimes written as Soulé; May 14, 1834 – January 26, 1926) was a Louisiana author, educator, and soldier best known for establishing Soule Business College in New Orleans around the time of the American Civil War, and presiding over that institution for over sixty years.

== Early life, education, and career ==
Born in Barrington, New York, his father, Ebenezer Soulé, died when Soule was three years old. Soule's mother later remarried to William H. Babcock, and in 1842 the family moved to DeKalb County, Illinois, where Soule lived on a farm until he was fourteen. He then entered Sycamore Academy at Sycamore, Illinois, graduating in 1853, and soon afterward moved to St. Louis, Missouri, to study medicine. He took a two years course in the McDowell Medical College and he also studied law and the commercial sciences in the Jones Business College, from which he graduated in 1856.

In November 1856, Soule moved to New Orleans and opened the Soule Commercial College and Literary Institute. The college, and his association with it, thereafter continued for the rest of his life, except for the few years when the school was closed during the American Civil War.

== Military service ==
During the war, Soule joined the Confederate States Army, in 1862, going to the front as captain of Company A, Crescent Regiment of Louisiana Volunteers, commanded by Col. Marshall J. Smith. Soule served with the Army of the Tennessee and the Trans-Mississippi Department. On the second day of the great Battle of Shiloh, on April 7, 1862, he was wounded and captured, was sent to prison on Johnson's Island in Lake Erie, and exchanged at Vicksburg September 17, 1862. The Crescent Regiment, originally mustered for ninety days, was reorganized in the fall of 1862 with Soule as major.

On the death of Lieut. Col. G. P. McPheeters at Labadieville, October 27, 1862, Soule succeeded to the rank of lieutenant colonel, and with the reorganized regiment he participated in all the engagements on the Bayou Teche, at Berwick Bay, the Battle of Fort Bisland, and others until November 3, 1863, when the regiment was united with the Confederate Guards, Response Battalion and the Eighteenth Battalion to form the consolidated Crescent Regiment. He was then temporarily assigned to post duty and later appointed by Gen. E. Kirby Smith as chief of the Labor Bureau District of Western Louisiana. There he served until June 9, 1865, when he was paroled from service.

== Educational career ==
Soule returned to New Orleans to find his school property destroyed or confiscated, but undertook to rebuild the school. By 1910, it was reported that over twenty-three thousand pupils had been taught there, and by 1922, Soule College was reported to have enrolled upwards of forty-thousand students. Soule taught many classes himself on a variety of subjects, particularly in the areas of mathematics, philosophy, and logic. He was described as "well known to every young man in New Orleans, and to educators north and south". On June 5, 1918, Tulane University bestowed upon Soule the honorary degree of LL.D.

During his tenure at Soule College, Soule wrote and published numerous academic texts, including Soulé's Philosophic Practical Mathematics, which reached its thirteenth edition in 1966; Analytic and Philosophic Commercial and Exchange Calculator, published in 1872; Contractions in Numbers, published in 1873; Intermediate Philosophic Arithmetic, third edition published in 1921; New Science and Practice of Accounts, the tenth edition of which was published in 1919; Gems of Business Problems, published in 1885; Manual of Auditing, published in 1892; and Partnership Settlements, published in 1893. His work on Philosophic Practical Mathematics was described in 1922 as "the most extensive of the kind ever published, and is notable for the substitution of reasoning processes for the many arbitrary rules that have encumbered most text books on arithmetic".

Soule was a member of organizations including the National Educational Association, the Chartered Accountants of New Orleans, the Institute of Accounts of New York, the National Geographic Society, Southern Sociological Congress, and the Shakespeare Club. He served for a time as president of the Business Educators' Association of America. For several years he was prominent in the Carnival Association, being chosen Rex, King of Carnival, in 1887.

== Personal life and death ==
On September 6, 1860, Soule married Mary Jane Reynolds of Summit, Mississippi, with whom he had nine children, of whom six survived to adulthood. Soule's wife died in 1918.

Soule died eight years later, in his home in New Orleans, at the age of 91. At the time of his death, it was noted that Soule College was "probably the oldest institution of its type in the South".
