= Solé (surname) =

Solé is a French and Spanish surname. Notable people with the surname include:

- Bernat Solé (born 1975), Catalan politician
- Jean Solé (born 1948) known as Solé, French comics artist
- Julien Solé (born 1971), known as Julien/CDM, French comics artist, son of Jean Solé
- Jordi Solé Tura (1930–2009), Spanish politician
- Pedro Solé (1905–1982), Spanish footballer
- Robert Solé (born 1946), French writer and journalist

== See also ==
- Solé (born 1973), American rapper
