= Soulé Steam Feed Works =

- U.S. Historic district – Contributing property
- Mississippi Landmark
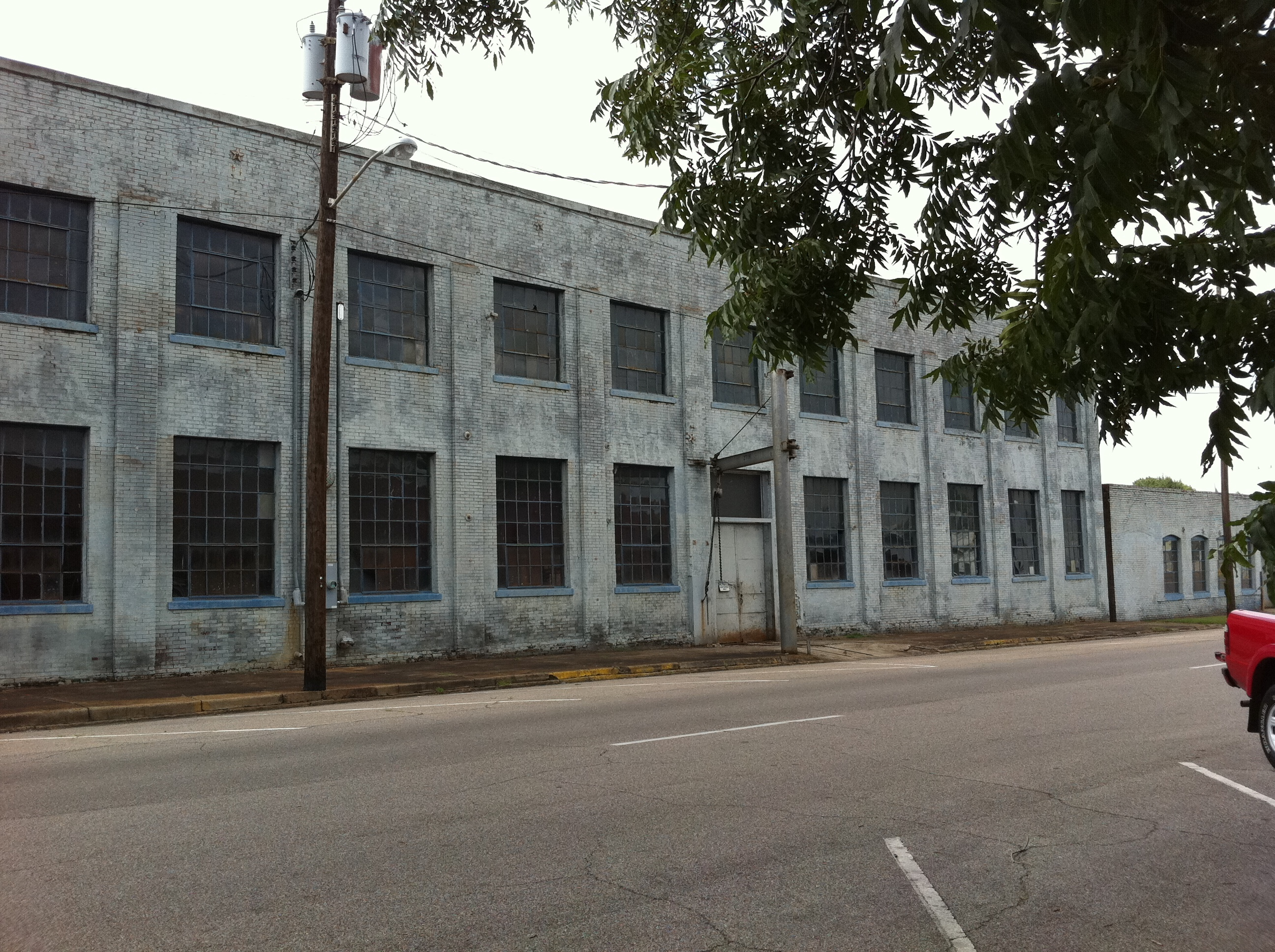
- Main factory in 2010

- Location within Mississippi Location within the United States
- Location: 1806–1808 4th St and 1803–1809 5th St, Meridian, Mississippi
- Coordinates: 32.365539°N 88.696399°W
- Built: 1891
- Part of: Union Station Historic District (ID79003731)
- MPS: Meridian MRA
- USMS No.: 075-MER-0133-NRD-ML; 075-MER-0134-NRD-ML; 075-MER-0135-NRD-ML; 075-MER-0136-NRD-ML; 075-MER-0137-NRD-MRA-ML,

Significant dates
- Designated CP: December 18, 1979
- Designated USMS: September 18, 2003

Soulé Steam Feed Works is a historic business founded in Meridian, Mississippi in 1892 and incorporated in 1893 by George Soulé. The complex was listed as a contributing property to Union Station Historic District, which was placed on the National Register of Historic Places in 1979 under the Meridian Multiple Resource Area (MRA). It was listed as a Mississippi Landmark in 2003. The business, known for its many patented innovations in steam engine technology, reached its height around the turn of the 20th century, producing products that were sold around the world.

In 2004, the Mississippi Industrial Heritage Museum obtained the deed to the complex and has operated there since. The museum hosts an annual Soulé Live Steam Festival at the complex attracting thousands of people from around the nation.

== George Soulé ==
George Wilberforce Soulé, founder of Soulé Steam Feed Works, was born in Buffalo, New York in 1849. He was a descendant of another George Soule who came to America on the Mayflower. At the age of one, he and his father, Isaac, moved to Wisconsin. When young George was 20 years old, his father died, and he decided to leave the family farm and pursue his own livelihood. Despite having obtained less than one year of formal education, he served as a school teacher for one three-month term before heading south to end up in Morton, Mississippi, in 1875. He had originally missed a ship to Cuba, but stayed at several businesses in Morton and Shubuta, Mississippi, before moving his operations to Meridian in 1879. Businesses operated by Soulé upon entering Meridian included a turpentine company, a lumber company, a cotton gin, and a manufacturer's representative. Before he moved to Meridian, he was involved in a railroad accident in March 1876 in which he lost his left leg and four toes of his right foot.

Soulé founded two other companies before Steam Feed Works, the Southern Standard Cotton Press Company and the Progress Manufacturing Company. Short of money after his railroad accident, he decided to build his own cotton press for his fledgling cotton gin. The invention was simpler and less expensive than those on the market and attracted wide attention. Soulé called his invention the Southern Standard Cotton Press and founded the company around this machine. In 1881, two years after he moved the business to Meridian, the company sold 750 cotton presses all over the South.

In 1886, Soulé sold the Southern Standard Press after founding Progress Manufacturing in 1894, and invented the Ideal Hay-Press for use in the new company. This new business was located on 5th Street between 26th and 27th Avenues and grew to include a foundry and machine shop. Looking to invent more, he turned over active management to Progress Manufacturing in 1888 and began working on a small rotary engine. He sold Progress Manufacturing in 1891 and established Steam Feed Works. The business was incorporated in 1893. In total, Soulé patented over 40 items during his lifetime, including the Success Cotton Seed Huller and an improved version of the sugar mill.

In 1902, when the new Steam Feed Works had become well-established, Soulé found a country home in Santa Rosa County, Florida. He began to turn much of the company over to his son, Clyde, and spent more of his time in Florida, before returning to Meridian in 1917, where he stayed until his death on December 21, 1922. During his life he had two wives – Olivia Sherman Warren in 1873 and Constance Gara in 1907, two years after his former wife's death – and nine children. One of his grand children, also named George Soulé, was an influential R&B songwriter in the 1960s and 70s.

== Steam Feed Works ==
=== Complex ===
Soulé Steam Feed Works was originally located at the corner of 25th Avenue and 5th Street. The first building built on the company's present lot was built between 1890 and 1892 was formerly the Meridian Candy Factory. After the building was devastated by fire, George Soulé bought it and turned it into a machine shop, assembly area, and office for the up-and-coming business, which would later relocate there. The two-story building's facade was originally brick, but a layer of lime cement stucco was added in the 1930s, and a second layer was added in the late 1960s. Inside the building is an 8-by-12-foot (2.4 m × 3.7 m) fireproof vault, which holds the original company records. Above the vault, the company is written in gold. The vault was added after an 1895 fire destroyed George Soulé's office and the records in it.

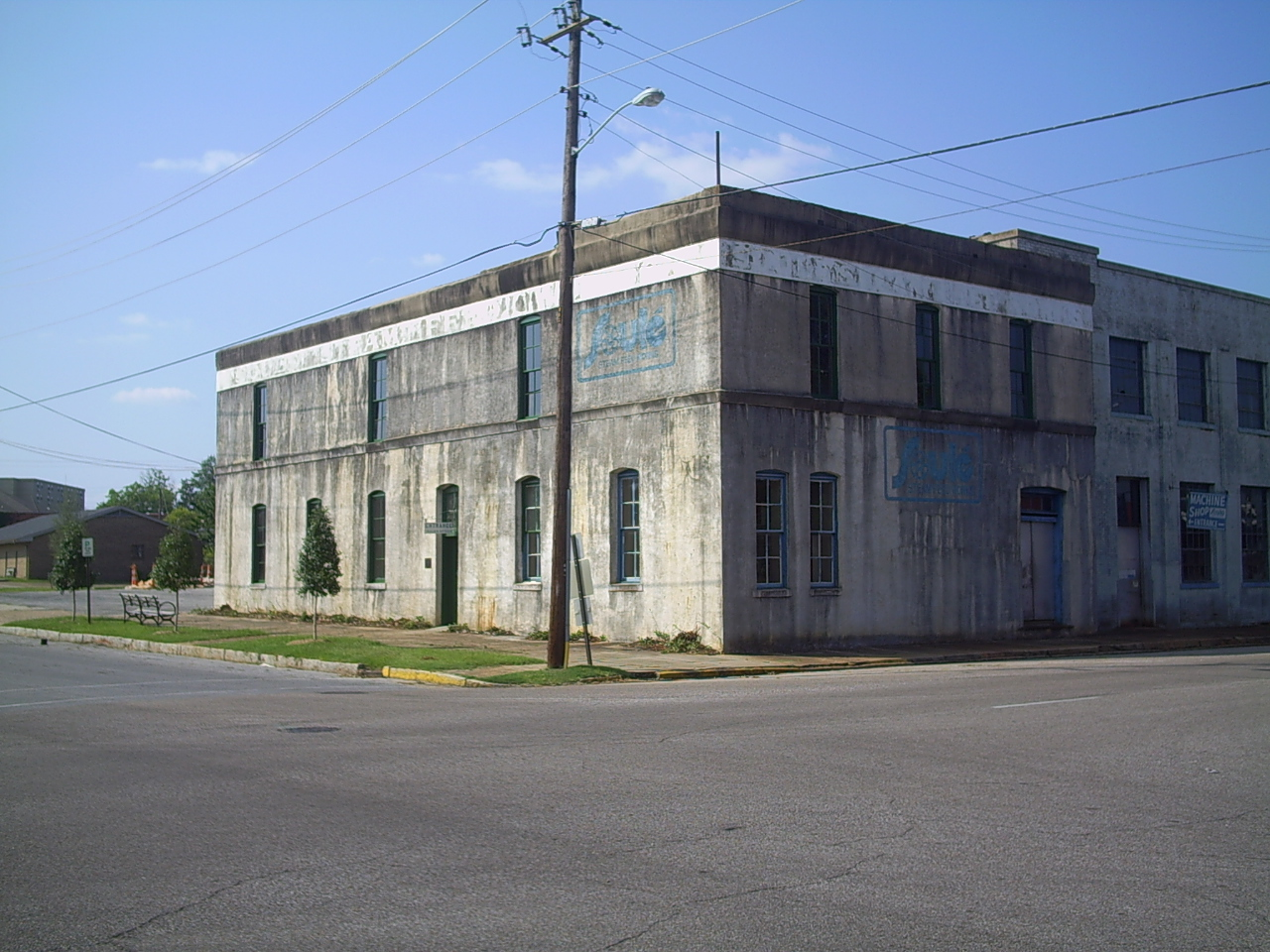
1907 annex, which contained an assembly room upstairs and a blacksmith shop downstairs

A second building was added on to the side of the original building in 1907, and the downstairs of the original building was converted into a mill supply store. Belt-driven machines are powered by a 100-foot (30 m) line shaft which stretches almost the entire length of the building. The line shaft, now the longest operating in the country, was powered by an electric motor dating from the early 1920s. There is also a blacksmith shop and two forges in the building, both of which are powered by the line shaft. A belt-driven wooden freight elevator was used to take finished castings to the assembly room upstairs and lower the finished products back downstairs. A system of rails and cranes allowed this heavy machinery and other items to be transported easily to the elevator and throughout the building. The crane system could also move items to the foundry (built in 1917) and the machine shop, as well as out to the street. There is a steam engine factory on the second floor of the building which contains another 25-foot (7.6 m) shaft that was driven by the main downstairs shaft. Fans were attached to this smaller shaft to keep the area cool during the summer.

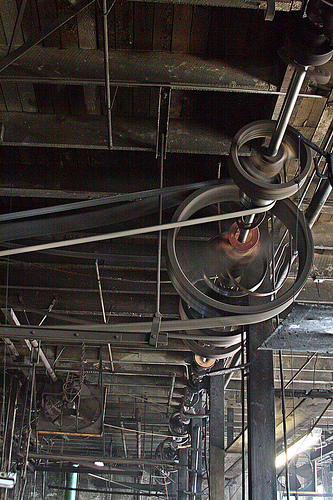
The line shaft, which is the longest operating one in the country

In October 1907 when the second building was built, Soulé employed 23 people in the foundry department and 23 machinists, making 46 total employees. By May 1917, the total number had dropped to 31 due to the shortage of manpower during World War I, but employee totals increased again after the war, averaging 50 people between 1922 and 1945. Employees were paid an average of 50 to 70 cents per hour – the highest paying jobs in Meridian at the time – and the foreman and supervisors would receive a weekly cash stipend of $7–9. Workers would be on duty six days a week for an average of nine hours per day.

A third building, the foundry, was added to the complex in 1917, and additions were made from 1923 to 1925. A cupola furnace that pre-dates the building itself was installed near the western end of the building and used to melt iron until a modern electric furnace was added in the 1970s. Both furnaces still exist in the building, and both can be used at the same time. In 1977 a Vulcan Engineering NoBake System was added. A fourth and fifth building were also added in the 1920s, although they were only used as storage and added no extra manufacturing ability to the complex.

Though during its peak the company produced and shipped many of its products around the world, after World War II, the company focused on the local and regional market. The upstairs of the original 1892 building was converted into storage in the 1950s. Other changes were also made in the latter half of the 20th century, including dividing the office space in the original building into cubicles, covering walls with Masonite board, and covering the floors with sheet vinyl. The Mississippi Industrial Heritage Museum received the title to the building in December 2003 and restored the building largely to its 1920s appearance.

=== Products ===
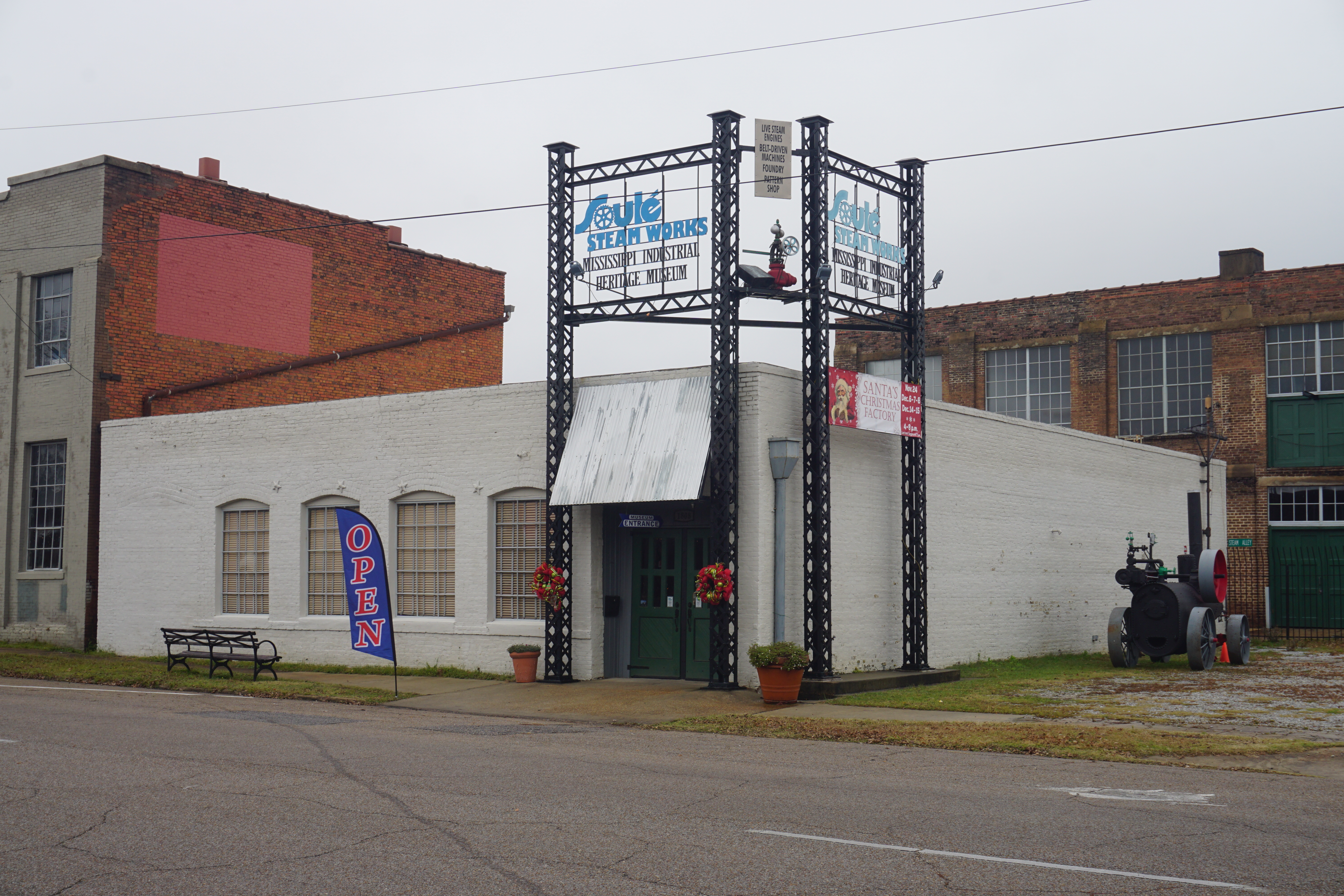
Mississippi Industrial Heritage Museum

The company is most widely known for serving the lumber industry that boomed from about 1885 to the 1930s. At the turn of the century, steam was the only portable and dependable source of power, and the Soulé Rotary Steam Engine was patented in 1896. The engine was used from 1892 to 1922 to drive sawmill carriages, which would help feed lumber into a spinning saw blade. The engine could also power winches to load and unload logs to and from railroad cars and wagons. A total of 2,300 engines were built at the plant and sold around the world; a few are still in operation in Australia and India. Other countries in which the engine was sold include South Africa, Cuba, Ecuador, Mexico, the Philippines, Brazil, Canada, New Zealand, Peru, Venezuela, and Colombia. Though the engines were touted as "the most durable and easily controlled" engines of the time, they were sometimes referred to as "steam hogs" because much steam was required to make them run. Soulé patented an improvement to the rotary engine in 1902, but more improvements were needed to keep up with competition.

The Soulé Spee-D-Twin, a two-cylinder reciprocating steam engine, was designed in 1922 and patented in 1923. Being much more efficient than its predecessor, the Spee-D-Twin became the favorite among sawmill operators. The engine featured a valve that allowed the engine to operate in both forward and reverse, and its small size allowed it to be retrofitted onto an existing carriage. When in full operation, the factory could produce one Spee-D-Twin per day. The company built and sold 4,301 Spee-D-Twins between 1923 and 1984 to people in all fifty states and internationally as well.

Soulé Steam Feed Works also patented the Simplex Automatic Lumber Edge Stacker in 1897, which would automate the process of stacking lumber. The first Edge Stacker was installed in the mill of Camp & Hinton Company in Lumberton, Mississippi in July 1895, and more than 100 were installed around the nation. Some notable mills in which Soulé Stackers were installed include the Great Southern Lumber Company in Bogalusa, Louisiana; Grays Harbor Commercial Company in Cosmopolis, Washington; and Potlatch Lumber Company in Elk River, Idaho.

Other products manufactured and sold by Soulé Steam Feed Works include the St. Bernard Saw Mill Dog, which would allow mills to extract lumber not only from large logs but from smaller ones as well. A.D. Hunter, an employee of Steam Feed Works, invented a plane-to-plane air refueling device while at work, which was used during Fred and Al Key's record-breaking endurance flight in 1935. Another employee, David Stephenson, fabricated the aluminum catwalk used during the flight to perform maintenance on the plane.

== Soulé Live Steam Festival ==
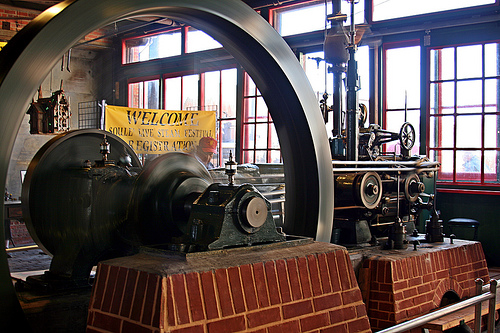
Watts-Campbell Corliss steam engine acquired in 2008

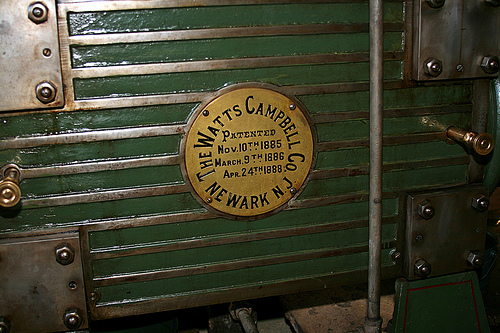
Watts-Campbell insignia on the engine

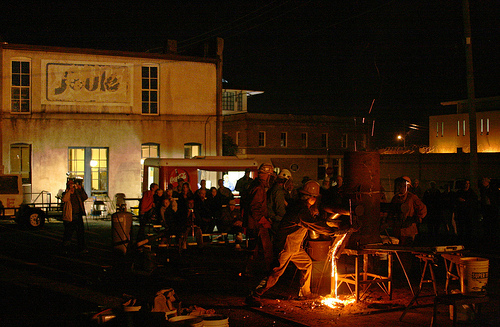
A molten iron demonstration during the 2009 Soulé Live Steam Festival

Beginning in October 2003, the Mississippi Industrial Heritage Museum began holding the Soulé Live Steam Festival, which showcases the history of steam engines, for which the company is most widely known. The festival has grown every year since and is the only steam show in the United States held at an actual steam engine factory.

The 2008 festival attracted nearly 2,000 people from 10 states to downtown Meridian. A Watts-Campbell Corliss steam engine, built in 1905, had been offered to the Smithsonian Institution in Washington, D.C., but they already had one, so it was given to the Mississippi Industrial Heritage Museum and installed during that year. The museum also owns the last steam engine ever built by the company.

The seventh annual festival in 2009 attracted several thousand visitors from 15 states and one foreign country. The event was also expanded to two days. During the event, the Watts-Campbell Corliss engine acquired in 2008 was demonstrated as well as an 1870 Manchester engine. Other steam engines were also brought in by the public and put on display. A portable sawmill was demonstrated as well.

Other demonstrations that regularly appear at the festival include blacksmith, broom-making, and pottery wheel demonstrations, as well as the operation of an antique print shop. Most of the displays at the festival have working examples that blow whistles, emit steam, and cut logs. Alabama Art Casting has held annual molten iron pours at Soule until recent years.
