= George Henry Soule Jr. =

American labor economist and writer (1887–1970)

George H. Soule Jr.
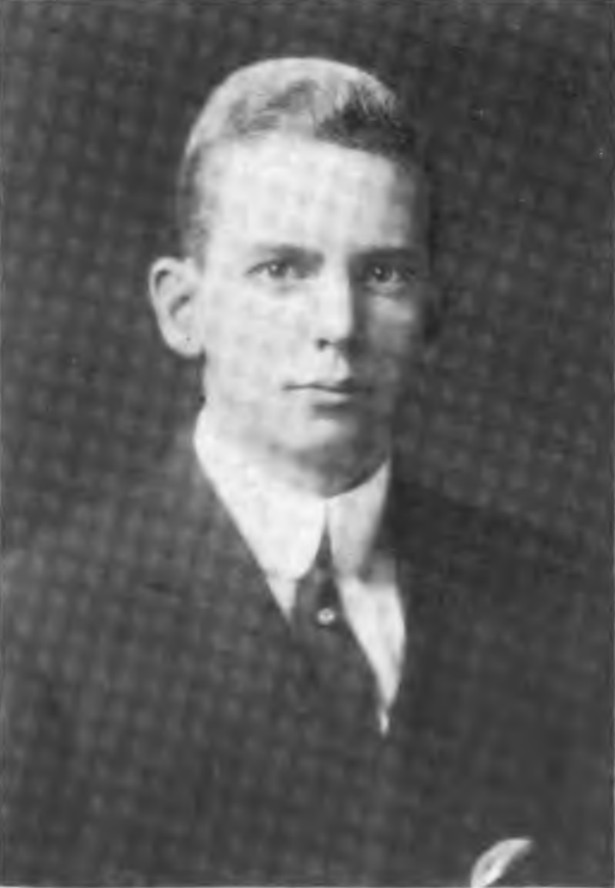
- GSoule in 1908
- Born: George Henry Soule Jr. June 11, 1887; Stamford, Connecticut, US
- Died: April 14, 1970 (aged 82)
- Education: Yale University
- Occupations: Journalist, economist, literary critic
- Spouse: Isobel Walker Soule (m. 1923, divorced) Helen Flanders Dunbar (m. 1940–1959)
- Writing career
- Years active: 1914–1967

George Henry Soule Jr. (June 11, 1887 – April 14, 1970) was an American labor economist, author, and a long time editor and contributor to The New Republic.

== Background ==
George Soule was born in Stamford, Connecticut on June 11, 1887, and was graduated from Yale University in 1908.

== Career ==
He was a member of the editorial staff of The New Republic from 1914 to 1918 and during 1919 editorial writer for the New York Evening Post.

In 1920, Soule helped organize the Labor Bureau, Inc. (LBI), an independent professional group, with Evans Clark, Alfred L. Bernheim, David J. Saposs. The LBI acted as economic advisers and public relations counselors for labor unions.

Soule drafted a report on the labour policy of the Industrial Service Sections Ordnance Department and Air Service for the War Department and was commissioned a Second Lieutenant in the Coast Artillery Corps. He was a director of the Labour Bureau, Inc., which engages in economic research for labour organizations.

He wrote the 1946 review of Animal Farm in The New Republic.

== Personal and death ==
In 1940 he was married to Helen Flanders Dunbar. A daughter, Marcia, was born in 1942.

== Works ==
- The New Unionism in the Clothing Industry with J.M. Budish, 1920
- The Intellectual and the Labor Movement, 1923
- The Coming American Revolution, 1934
- A Planned Society, 1935
- The Future of Liberty, 1936
- Ideas of the Great Economists, 1952
- Ideas of the Great Economist, 1958
- The New Science of Economics, 1964
- Planning U.S.A., 1967
