= George Soulé (musician) =

American singer-songwriter

- Born: George Soulé; November 12, 1945 (age 80)
- Origin: Meridian, Mississippi, United States
- Genre: soul,
- Occupations: Singer, song writer
- Years active: 1965–present
- Labels: Fame, Bell Records, MCA, United Artists, Soulscape

George Soulé (Note: He is a descendant of George Soule who was a signatory of the Mayflower Compact and the grandson of George Soulé who founded the Soulé Steam Feed Works in Meridian. Mississippi. He is also a descendant of Bishop Joshua Soule (1781 - 1867)) is an American songwriter, singer, drummer, record producer and studio engineer whose songs have been recorded by some of the most successful artists in soul music, including Percy Sledge, Carl Carlton, Temptations and Bobby Womack. In 1973 he had a Top 40 rhythm and blues hit as a solo artist with Get Involved.

== Biography ==
George Soulé (pronounced "Sue-lay") was born in Meridian, Mississippi, on November 12, 1945. As a teenager, he became a DJ at a Meridian radio station, WOKK, and recorded his first discs for Carol Rachou's La Louisianne and Tamm labels in the mid-1960s. In 1964 his song "Someone" was recorded by Sue Thompson and covered by Frank Ifield and Etta James. Soulé made his first television appearance on the pop-music program Shindig, appearing on the bill with Ray Charles.

Soulé started plugging his songs, often written with his friend Paul Davis, to music publishers in Memphis and Nashville. Around 1966, he signed a contract with Nashville's Acuff-Rose Music. He began working at the newly opened Malaco Records in Jackson, Mississippi, and in 1969 he began a stint at FAME Studios, in Sheffield, Alabama, where he worked with producers Rick Hall and Don Davis. Soulé wrote "Shoes", a hit for Brook Benton. He also wrote "I'll Be Your Everything", a chart success for Percy Sledge. His most productive writing partnership was with Terry Woodford. Among their best-known songs are "How Many Times", recorded by Mavis Staples, and "You Can't Stop a Man in Love", cut by Carl Carlton. Bobby Womack, The Temptations, Wilson Pickett and several well-known rhythm and blues artists.

During this period he played drums on recording sessions produced by Jerry Williams Jr., who also recorded under the name Swamp Dogg, for Brooks O'Dell and Z.Z. Hill, as well as sessions for other artists, such as Ernie Shelby. He was also in demand as a demo singer for other writers and as a backup vocalist. (Note: A collection of his demos from this period entitled 'Let me be the man' was released on the Soulscape label in 2011) In 1972 he sang on "Get Involved", a demo of a song written by Memphis songwriter George Jackson. It was conceived as a potential song for Wilson Pickett. FAME Records owner Rick Hall liked Soulé's version, and he recorded George for his own label. The song reached No. 35 in Billboard's R & B chart the following year, spawning a successful reggae cover version from Freddie McGregor and crossing the Atlantic to become a massive hit on British dancefloors. The song was featured on the nationally syndicated TV show Soul Train and caused a mild sensation when listeners realized that George Soulé was a white singer. Follow-up singles on FAME and United Artists didn't fare so well.

In 1975 George Soulé joined the Music Mill organization in Muscle Shoals, writing songs for Arthur Alexander, among others. He engineered sessions for Music Mill. He received the Country Music Association's song of the year award for his engineering and mixing of Narvel Felts hit "Reconsider Me". He wrote or co-wrote "What I Don't Know Won't Hurt Me" (William Bell), "Catch Me I'm Fallin'" (Esther Phillips), "After the Feeling Is Gone" (Lulu) and "We're Into Something Good" (Roy Orbison).

Soulé left music in the late '70s to work in the family iron smelting business in Meridian, returning to Muscle Shoals in 1987 as an announcer on WQLT FM radio. He continued to write songs, often with Ava Aldridge and Eddie Struzick. He wrote "Poor Boy Blue" for Johnnie Taylor and "A Woman Without Love" for Dorothy Moore. He also recorded a duet with Aldridge that was released on MCA. In 1996 Soulé was back in Mississippi working at a casino.

== Return to solo recording ==
In 2004 he was part of the newly formed Country Soul Revue, who recorded a CD titled Testyfing for Casual Records. He performed with other members of the Country Soul Revue onstage a year later at London, England's Barbican Theatre in a highly acclaimed return to performing for the first time in twenty years. He followed this with 2007's Take A Ride, cut for Zane Records. Recorded in Nashville at producer Mark Nevers' Beech House Recording, it was produced by Nevers and Jeb Loy Nichols, and included guitarist and songwriter Greg Cartwright's "Wait and See". In 2011 he released Let Me Be a Man, a collection of tracks he recorded in Alabama.
