= National Register of Historic Places listings in Jones County, Mississippi =

Location of Jones County in Mississippi

This is a list of the National Register of Historic Places listings in Jones County, Mississippi.

This is intended to be a complete list of the properties and districts on the National Register of Historic Places in Jones County, Mississippi, United States. Latitude and longitude coordinates are provided for many National Register properties and districts; these locations may be seen together in a map.

There are 13 properties and districts listed on the National Register in the county. Another property was once listed but has been removed.

This National Park Service list is complete through NPS recent listings posted September 26, 2025.

== Current listings ==
	Name on the Register	Image	Date listed	Location	City or town	Description
1	Bynum-Anderson House	Bynum-Anderson House	September 15, 2022 (#100008163)	701 Holly St. 31°36′06″N 89°11′14″W	Ellisville	
2	Amos Deason House	Amos Deason House	July 5, 1984 (#84002229)	410 North Deason Street; 31°36′33″N 89°11′49″W	Ellisville	Constructed c. 1855
3	Evans House and Barn		June 10, 2025 (#100011760)	159 Wisteria Trail (house) and 161 Wisteria Trail (barn); 31°42′25″N 89°05′52″W	Laurel vicinity	
4	Fishtrap Bluff Fishweir		August 15, 1997 (#97000896)	Address restricted	Ellisville	
5	G.W.O. Site		November 23, 1999 (#99001361)	Address restricted	Lanham	
6	Jones County Courthouse and Confederate Monument at Ellisville	Jones County Courthouse and Confederate Monument at Ellisville	November 10, 1994 (#94001307)	Bounded by Court, Holly, Calhoun and Ivy Streets; 31°36′14″N 89°11′42″W	Ellisville	Constructed 1907-08
7	Lamar Elementary School		June 2, 2023 (#100009007)	400 15th St. West; 31°42′28″N 89°07′45″W	Laurel	
8	Laurel Central Historic District	Laurel Central Historic District	September 4, 1987 (#86001908)	Roughly bounded by 10th and 13th Sts., 1st Ave., 7th and 5th Sts., and 8th Ave. 31°41′52″N 89°07′54″W	Laurel	Boundary changes approved October 5, 2021.
9	New Orleans and Northeastern Railroad Depot	New Orleans and Northeastern Railroad Depot	October 31, 1995 (#95001192)	Maple Street; 31°41′32″N 89°07′39″W	Laurel	Constructed c. 1913
10	William H. and Marian D. Mason House	William H. and Marian D. Mason House	September 28, 2017 (#100001680)	1050 N. 6th Ave. 31°42′07″N 89°08′00″W	Laurel	
11	Oak Park School Complex	Oak Park School Complex	March 4, 2020 (#100005034)	1205 Queensburg Ave. 31°40′23″N 89°08′25″W	Laurel	
12	Newell Rogers House	Newell Rogers House	April 20, 1987 (#87000604)	706 North 6th Avenue; 31°41′49″N 89°08′01″W	Laurel	Constructed 1909
13	Southside Neighborhood Historic District		September 8, 2020 (#100005573)	Roughly bounded by North Pine and East 5th Sts., North and South Walters, South 4th and South 9th Aves., East Jackson, Limbert, Johnson, and North and South Maple Sts. 31°40′55″N 89°08′00″W	Laurel	

=== Former listing ===
	Name on the Register	Image	Date listed	Date removed	Location	City or town	Description
1	Pinehurst Hotel		March 1, 1984 (#84002234)	October 1, 1987	318 5th Ave.	Laurel	Mostly demolished in 1987. Remaining portion is a contributing property to the Laurel Central Historic District

== See also ==
- List of National Historic Landmarks in Mississippi
- National Register of Historic Places listings in Mississippi
