= Jones High School =

Jones High School may refer to one of the following high schools in the United States:

- Jesse H. Jones High School — Houston, Texas
- Jones High School (Florida) — Orlando, Florida
- Jones County High School — Gray, Georgia
- Jones College Prep High School, Chicago, Illinois
- Jones Senior High School — Trenton, North Carolina
- Jones High School (Oklahoma) — Jones, Oklahoma
- Scipio Jones High School — North Little Rock, Arkansas
- Northeast Jones High School — Laurel, Mississippi
- South Jones High School — Ellisville, Mississippi
- West Jones High School — Laurel, Mississippi
- Jones County High School — Murdo, South Dakota
- A C Jones High School — Beeville, Texas
