= Northeast Jones High School =

Location
- 68 Northeast Drive; Laurel, Mississippi 39443; United States; 31.695843°N 89.051724°W

Information
- Type: Public secondary
- Established: 1965; 61 years ago
- School district: Jones County School District
- Principal: P.T. Jones
- Teaching staff: 84.63 (on an FTE basis)
- Grades: 7–12
- Enrollment: 988 (2022–2023)
- Student to teacher ratio: 11.67
- Colors: Black and gold
- Athletics conference: MSHSAA 5A Region 4
- Nickname: Tigers
- Website: nej.jonesk12.org

Northeast Jones High School (NEJ) is a public high school located in Jones County, Mississippi, United States, near the city of Laurel. Northeast Jones serves students in grades 7 through 12 and is one of three traditional high schools in the Jones County School District.

== History ==
As part of a wider Jones County School District consolidation, Northeast Jones High School opened in 1965 as the product of three local high schools.

After school integration in the United States, a black student was hung in a bathroom and suffered nonfatal injuries. After a couple more years, NEJ students rioted in 1972, drawing the National Guard to the school.

On February 28, 1987 just after 9:00 a.m., a 2 mile wide F4 tornado demolished Glade Elementary School and continued on its destructive path towards Northeast Jones where it caused severe damages. The tornado struck on a Saturday morning sparing many lives of children. Six people were killed. The tornado caused 28.5 million dollars in damage. Damages caused 1600 students to attend classes elsewhere due to the damages to both schools.

In 2017, after 5 years as assistant principal, NEJ alumnus Dr. Jennifer Lowery was named head principal, becoming the school’s first female supervising principal. Furthermore, in 2024, Northeast Jones High School alumnus Dr. P.T. Jones was named the principal of Northeast Jones High School after serving many years as assistant principal at the school. Jones is the first African American head principal at Northeast Jones High School

Northeast Jones High School is also home to Ann Tucker, age 85, who has been teaching at the school for 61 years; she has altogether taught for 65 years. Although not officially documented, it is widely accepted that Ann Tucker has been teaching longer than anyone in the state of Mississippi. In 2022, Ann Tucker was recognized by the Mississippi State Legislature for her longevity and service to Northeast Jones High School. House Resolution 95 commended her for her "outstanding tenure".

== Athletics ==
Northeast Jones athletic teams are nicknamed the Tigers and compete in Mississippi High School Activities Association 5A Region 4. The football team won the 1996 MSHSAA Class 4A championship.

Northeast Jones High School boasts numerous athletics teams including archery, baseball, basketball, e-sports, football, softball, swimming, cross-country track, golf, powerlifting, soccer, tennis, volleyball, and track and field. In 2024, the NEJ Archery team placed third in the Mississippi Archery Championships.

== Performing arts ==
NEJ fields two competitive show choirs: the high school mixed-gender "Gold Horizons" and middle school mixed-gender "Tiger Vibe. The performing arts program also hosts an annual competition.

== Notable alumni ==
- Marsha Blackburn, politician
- Kenny Payne, basketball coach and former player
- Robin Robinson, politician
- Shad White, politician
