= Deason =

Deason is a surname. Notable people with the surname include:

- Alis Deason, British astrophysicist
- Darwin Deason (1940–2025), American billionaire businessman and political donor
- Kitty Wells (born Ellen Muriel Deason, 1919–2012), American singer
- Sean Deason, American techno music producer

== See also ==
- Amos Deason House
