= Sharon, Mississippi =

Sharon, Mississippi may refer to:

- Sharon, Jones County, Mississippi, a census-designated place in the United States
- Sharon, Madison County, Mississippi, an unincorporated community in the United States
