= Laurel School District =

Laurel School District is a name shared by several school districts in the United States.

- Laurel School District (Delaware) of Laurel, Delaware
- Laurel School District (Mississippi) of Laurel, Mississippi
- Laurel School District (Pennsylvania) of Lawrence County, Pennsylvania

Also:

- Laurel County School District, in London, Kentucky
