= Byron Young (defensive lineman) =

American football player (born 2000)

No. 94 – Philadelphia Eagles
- Position: Defensive tackle
- Roster status: Active

Personal information
- Born: November 10, 2000 (age 26); Taylorsville, Mississippi, U.S.
- Listed height: 6 ft 3 in (1.91 m)
- Listed weight: 292 lb (132 kg)

Career information
- High school: West Jones (Laurel, Mississippi)
- College: Alabama (2019–2022)
- NFL draft: 2023: 3rd round, 70th overall pick

Career history
- Las Vegas Raiders (2023); Philadelphia Eagles (2024–present)

Awards and highlights
- Super Bowl champion (LIX); CFP national champion (2020); Second-team All-SEC (2022)

Career NFL statistics as of Week 9, 2026
- Total tackles: 56
- Sacks: 2.5
- Fumble recoveries: 1
- Stats at Pro Football Reference

Byron Young (born November 10, 2000) is an American professional football defensive tackle for the Philadelphia Eagles of the National Football League (NFL). He was drafted by the Las Vegas Raiders in the third round of the 2023 NFL draft. He played college football for the Alabama Crimson Tide.

== Early life ==
Young grew up in Taylorsville, Mississippi, and attended West Jones High School. He committed to play football for the Alabama Crimson Tide.

== College career ==
In his collegiate career, Young totaled 130 tackles, 20 being for a loss, 7.5 sacks, three pass deflections, a forced fumble, and a recovery. His best collegiate year occurred in 2022 where he posted 48 tackles, 5.5 going for a loss, four sacks, two pass deflections, and one forced fumble. For his performance, he was named to the Second Team All-SEC.

On January 5, 2023, Young declared for the 2023 NFL draft.

== Professional career ==
Pre-draft measurables
Height	Weight	Arm length	Hand span	Wingspan	Three-cone drill	Vertical jump	Broad jump	Bench press
6 ft 3 3/8 in (1.91 m)	294 lb (133 kg)	34 3/8 in (0.87 m)	11 in (0.28 m)	6 ft 9 1/8 in (2.06 m)	7.68 s	26.0 in (0.66 m)	9 ft 0 in (2.74 m)	24 reps
All values from NFL Combine

=== Las Vegas Raiders ===
Young was selected by the Las Vegas Raiders in the third round, 70th overall, of the 2023 NFL draft. He was placed on the physically unable to perform list on July 21, 2023. On August 6, Young was activated after passing a physical. He appeared in six games as a rookie.

On August 28, 2024, Young was waived by the Raiders.

=== Philadelphia Eagles ===
Young was claimed off waivers by the Philadelphia Eagles on August 29, 2024. He was placed on injured reserve due to a hamstring injury on October 25. Young's practice window was opened by the team on January 8, 2025, but did not play in a game in the 2024 season. He won a Super Bowl championship when the Eagles defeated the Kansas City Chiefs 40–22 in Super Bowl LIX.

=== Regular season ===
Year	Team	Games		Tackles					Interceptions				Fumbles			
Year	Team	GP	GS	Cmb	Solo	Ast	Sck	TFL	PD	Int	Yds	TD	FF	FR	Yds	TD
2023	LV	6	0	4	4	0	0.0	0	0	0	0	0	0	0	0	0
2025	PHI	17	1	37	13	24	2.5	0	0	0	0	0	0	1	0	0
Career		23	1	41	17	24	2.5	0	0	0	0	0	0	1	0	0
