= John R. Baylis =

American chemist and sanitary engineer

- Born: May 11, 1885; Eastabuchie, Mississippi
- Died: October 31, 1963 (aged 78); Chicago, Illinois
- Education: BS, Mississippi State College, 1905.
- Occupation(s): Chemist and sanitary engineer for water utilities
- Known for: Advances in water purification especially filtration and control of tastes and odors
- Awards: Water Industry Hall of Fame, American Water Works Association, 1971.

John Robert Baylis (May 11, 1885 – October 31, 1963) was an American chemist and sanitary engineer. His career extended from about 1905 to 1963 and he is best known for his work in applied research to improve drinking water purification.

== Early life and education ==
Baylis was born in rural Mississippi (Eastabuchie, Jones County) but lived most of his adult life in northern U.S. states. He attended Mississippi State College where he received his bachelor of science degree in 1905. He also received training as a railroad engineer and as a construction engineer for water and sewage plants.

== Career ==
Baylis’s first professional assignment (about 1905) was as manager of the Jackson, Mississippi water works. In 1917 he was hired as a bacteriologist at the Montebello Filter Plant in Baltimore, MD. His tenure there was only nine years and when he left he was the principal sanitary chemist with the department. During his employment at Baltimore he developed a pH meter based on a tungsten wire. The Baltimore water treatment plant was one of the first to use pH for process control. About 1927, he moved his family to Chicago where he was put in charge of water purification research for the city. His job title was chemist, but he developed many of the advances in water treatment during the 1930s and 1940s. These advances included:

- Preventing corrosion of pipes
- Filter bed cleaning with a fixed-grid surface wash system
- Developing activated silica as a coagulant aid
- Invention of a low-level turbidimeter
- Initiation of lime use for pH adjustment
- Pioneering the development of high rate filtration (2 to 5 gallons per minute/square foot)
- Building an experimental treatment facility to study water purification methods
- Understanding the causes and cures of taste and odor problems in drinking water

In 1938, Baylis was put in charge of the design of the South District Filtration Plant, which was completed in 1943. He was in charge of the operation of the plant and was named engineer of water purification in 1942, which he held until his death.

In 1935, he wrote a book entitled Elimination of Taste and Odor in Water. The work became a classic in the field of sanitary engineering and paved the way for others to control taste and odor problems. The book goes into some detail on how and where to feed powdered activated carbon (PAC) for taste and odor control.

Perhaps his greatest achievement was the development of PAC. Up until Baylis’s work, activated carbon was only available in granular form which was used in a filtration mode. PAC could be formed into a slurry and fed like any other chemical into the treatment process. He received a U.S. patent for PAC as well as for other water treatment advances.

Baylis was one of the first sanitary engineers to raise concerns about open finished water reservoirs. On November 3, 1938, he testified at a public service commission hearing in Milwaukee. He called the open Kilburn park reservoir a “source of danger” to the health of the city. Baylis said that “…the reservoir should be roofed to prevent pollution from birds, insects, rodents, small animals, dirt, soot, leaves and other debris which he said was in the open water.” It would take many decades before his concerns were codified into a USEPA regulation that deals specifically with this danger to human health.

== Personal life ==
He married Pearl F. Spencer, a young woman from Mississippi, about 1920. They had two children, Josephine born in 1922 and John Robert Baylis Jr. born in 1927.

== Professional associations ==
Baylis was active in the American Water Works Association. He was elected Chairman of the Illinois Section of AWWA in 1932 and he became the Section Secretary from 1915 to 1919.

== Honors and awards ==
Baylis received the George Warren Fuller Award In 1939, and in 1971, he was one of the first five men inducted into the American Water Works Association Water Industry Hall of Fame. In 1946, Baylis was made an honorary member of AWWA. In 1932, he was the first person awarded the John M. Goodell Prize from AWWA. Now called the Publications Award, it is conferred on the author of the best paper published that year in the Journal AWWA. He was given the James Laurie Prize by the American Society of Civil Engineers in 1927. The award was established to recognize contributions to the advancement of transportation engineering, either in research, planning, design, or construction.

Baylis was awarded a Commendation for Meritorious Service by the Northwestern Technological Institute in 1951. He was given the Distinguished Service Award from the American Chemical Society on September 18, 1958. In 1970, Mayor Richard J. Daley dedicated the John R. Baylis Memorial library at Chicago's Central Water Filtration Plant. The library contains his published papers, reports and archives.

== Limited list of publications ==
- Baylis, John R. (1926). “Factors Other Than Dissolved Oxygen Influencing the Corrosion of Iron Pipes.” Ind. Eng. Chem. 18:4 370-80.
- Baylis, John R. (1927). “Treatment of Water To Prevent Corrosion.” Ind. Eng. Chem. 19:7 777-81.
- Spector, Bertha K., John R. Baylis and Oscar Gullans. (1934). "Effectiveness of Filtration in Removing from Water, and of Chlorine in Killing, the Causative Organism of Amoebic Dysentery." Public Health Reports. 49:27(July 6, 1934): 786.
- Baylis, John R. (1935). Elimination of Taste and Odor in Water. New York:McGraw-Hill.
- Baylis, John R. (1948). “Chemical Control at Chicago’s South District Filtration Plant.” Ind. Eng. Chem. 40:8 1379-84.
- Baylis, John R. (1952). “Slurry Feeding of Activated Carbon.” Journal AWWA. 44:12 1161-68.
