= Charles Cross (American football) =

American football player (born 2000)

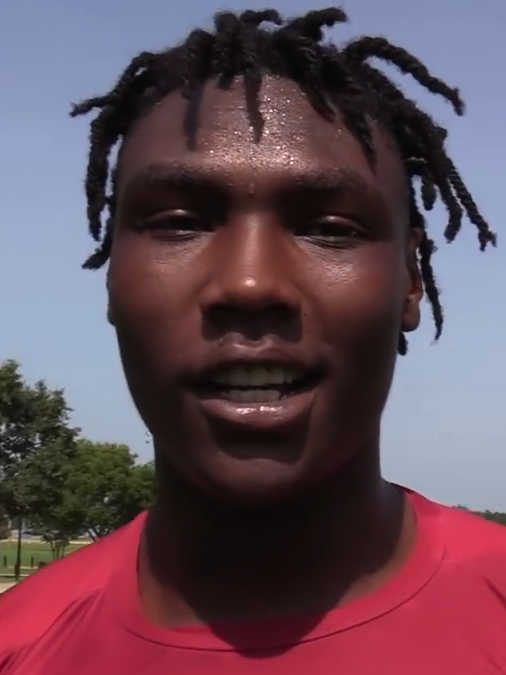
- Cross in 2018

No. 67 – Seattle Seahawks
- Position: Offensive tackle
- Roster status: Active

Personal information
- Born: November 25, 2000 (age 25); Laurel, Mississippi, U.S.
- Listed height: 6 ft 5 in (1.96 m)
- Listed weight: 317 lb (144 kg)

Career information
- High school: Laurel (MS)
- College: Mississippi State (2019–2021)
- NFL draft: 2022: 1st round, 9th overall pick

Career history
- Seattle Seahawks (2022–present)

Awards and highlights
- Super Bowl champion (LX); First-team All-SEC (2021)

Career NFL statistics as of Week 1, 2026
- Games played: 63
- Games started: 63
- Stats at Pro Football Reference

Charles Ellis Cross (born November 25, 2000) is an American professional football offensive tackle for the Seattle Seahawks of the National Football League (NFL). He played college football for the Mississippi State Bulldogs and was selected ninth overall by the Seahawks in the 2022 NFL draft.

== Early life ==
Cross was born on November 25, 2000, and grew up in Laurel, Mississippi, where he attended Laurel High School. Cross initially committed to play college football at Florida State. Cross decommitted from Florida State during his senior season in favor of signing with Mississippi State. He played in the 2018 All-American Bowl as a senior.

== College career ==
Cross redshirted his true freshman season at Mississippi State after appearing in three games. He was named the Bulldogs' starting left tackle going into his redshirt freshman season. Cross started 10 games and was named to the Southeastern Conference (SEC) All-Freshman team at the end of the season. Cross entered his redshirt sophomore season as one of the top offensive tackle prospects for the 2022 NFL draft and was a preseason second-team All-SEC selection. He declared for the 2022 NFL draft following the season.

== Professional career ==
Pre-draft measurables
Height	Weight	Arm length	Hand span	Wingspan	40-yard dash	10-yard split	20-yard split	20-yard shuttle	Three-cone drill	Vertical jump	Broad jump	Bench press
6 ft 4 3/4 in (1.95 m)	307 lb (139 kg)	34 1/2 in (0.88 m)	10 3/4 in (0.27 m)	6 ft 9 in (2.06 m)	4.95 s	1.75 s	2.92 s	4.61 s	7.88 s	30.5 in (0.77 m)	9 ft 4 in (2.84 m)	20 reps
All values from NFL Combine/Pro Day

Cross was selected ninth overall in the first round by the Seattle Seahawks in the 2022 NFL draft. The Seahawks used the first-round selection that was acquired in the trade that sent Russell Wilson to the Denver Broncos. Acting as his own agent, Cross signed his four-year rookie contract with the team on June 2, 2022. As a rookie, Cross appeared in and started all 17 regular season games and one playoff game for the Seahawks in the 2022 season. In the 2023 season, he appeared in and started 14 games. In the 2024 season, he started in all 17 games.

On April 28, 2025, the Seahawks exercised the fifth-year option on Cross's contract. On January 4, 2026, Cross signed a four-year, $104.4 million contract extension with Seattle that included $75 million guaranteed. He started in Super Bowl LX, a 29–13 win over the New England Patriots.
