= Amy, Mississippi =

- Unincorporated community
- Location within Mississippi Location within the United States
- Coordinates: 31°46′39″N 89°15′30″W
- Country: United States
- State: Mississippi
- County: Jones
- Elevation: 361 ft (110 m)
- Time zone: UTC-6 (Central (CST))
  - Summer (DST): UTC-5 (CDT)
- Area codes: 601 & 769
- GNIS feature ID: 685444

Amy is an unincorporated community in Jones County, Mississippi. The community is located on Mississippi Highway 533, 1.7 miles (2.7 km) north-northeast of Soso.

In 1900, Amy had a post office and a population of 27.
