= Jack Nix =

Jack Nix may refer to:

- Jack Nix (American football, born 1928) (1928–2024), American and Canadian football end for the San Francisco 49ers and Saskatchewan Roughriders
- Jack Nix (American football, born 1917) (1917–1990), American football wing back for the Cleveland Rams
