= Moselle, Mississippi =

Unincorporated community in Mississippi, US

- Census-designated place
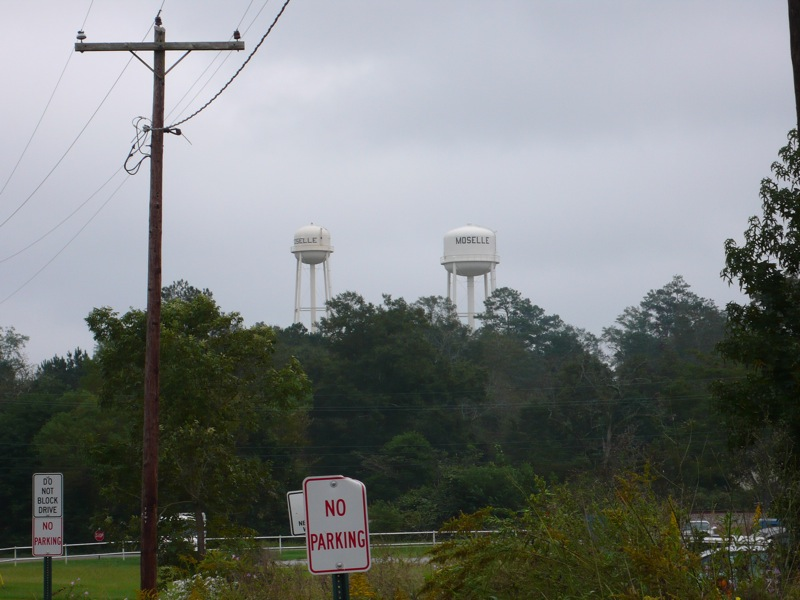
- Two water towers at Moselle

- Location within Mississippi Location within the United States
- Coordinates: 31°30′09″N 89°16′44″W
- Country: United States
- State: Mississippi
- County: Jones

Area
  - Total: 1.65 sq mi (4.28 km^{2})
  - Land: 1.65 sq mi (4.28 km^{2})
  - Water: 0 sq mi (0.00 km^{2})
- Elevation: 233 ft (71 m)

Population (2020)
  - Total: 304
  - Density: 183.9/sq mi (71.02/km^{2})
- Time zone: UTC-6 (Central (CST))
  - Summer (DST): UTC-5 (CDT)
- ZIP code: 39459
- Area code: 601
- FIPS code: 28-49160
- GNIS feature ID: 673862

Moselle is a census-designated place (CDP) and unincorporated community in southern Jones County, Mississippi. As of the 2020 census, Moselle had a population of 304. The community is part of the Laurel micropolitan area.

== History ==
Moselle has a post office, with the ZIP code 39459.

Moselle is located on the Norfolk Southern Railway and was incorporated on December 14, 1905. It was unincorporated at an unknown date.

It was first named as a CDP in the 2020 Census which listed a population of 304.

== Geography ==
Moselle is located along U.S. Route 11, north of Eastabuchie and southwest of Laurel. The Leaf River, as well as the Hattiesburg-Laurel Regional Airport, are located west of Moselle.

== Demographics ==
Historical population
Census	Pop.	Note	%±
2020	304		—
U.S. Decennial Census; 2020

Moselle was first listed as a census designated place in the 2020 U.S. census.

=== 2020 census ===
Moselle CDP, Mississippi – Racial and ethnic composition Note: the US Census treats Hispanic/Latino as an ethnic category. This table excludes Latinos from the racial categories and assigns them to a separate category. Hispanics/Latinos may be of any race.
Race / Ethnicity (NH = Non-Hispanic)	Pop 2020	% 2020
White alone (NH)	209	68.75%
Black or African American alone (NH)	2	0.66%
Native American or Alaska Native alone (NH)	0	0.00%
Asian alone (NH)	1	0.33%
Native Hawaiian or Pacific Islander alone (NH)	0	0.00%
Other race alone (NH)	1	0.33%
Mixed race or Multiracial (NH)	11	3.62%
Hispanic or Latino (any race)	80	26.32%
Total	304	100.00%

== Transportation ==
Hattiesburg–Laurel Regional Airport has a Moselle postal address, however it is not located in the Moselle CDP.

== Education ==
Public education in Moselle is provided by the Jones County School District. Campuses serving the community include Moselle Elementary School, a K-6 school located in Moselle, and South Jones High School, located in Ellisville.

Jones County is in the zone of Jones College.

== Notable people ==
- Thermon Blacklidge, former member of the National Basketball League
- Jack Nix, former National Football League wing back
- Ronnie Shows, U.S Representative from Mississippi.
- Roy M. Wheat, posthumously awarded the Medal of Honor for his actions in the Vietnam War.
