= Dontario Drummond =

American football player (born 1997)

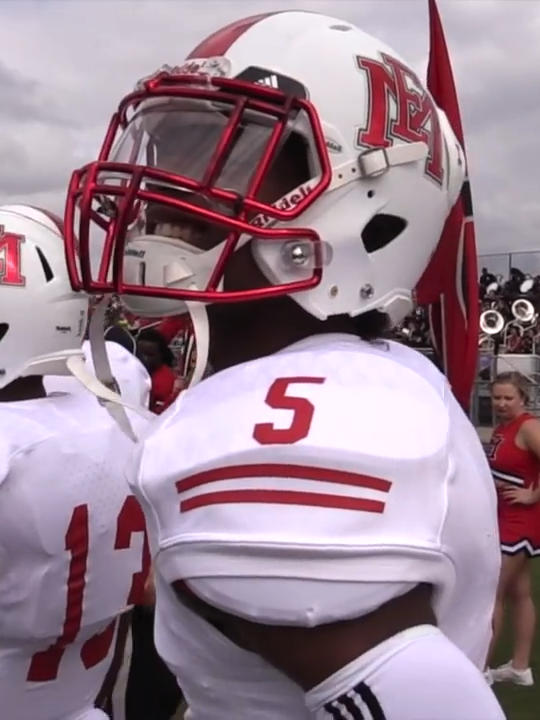
- Drummond with East Mississippi CC in 2017

Profile
- Position: Wide receiver

Personal information
- Born: August 22, 1997 (age 29); Laurel, Mississippi, U.S.
- Listed height: 6 ft 1 in (1.85 m)
- Listed weight: 212 lb (96 kg)

Career information
- High school: Laurel (Laurel, MS)
- College: East Mississippi (2017–2018); Ole Miss (2019–2021)
- NFL draft: 2022: undrafted

Career history
- Dallas Cowboys (2022)*; Calgary Stampeders (2024)*
- * Offseason or practice squad member only
- Stats at Pro Football Reference

Dontario Tyron Drummond (born August 22, 1997) is an American professional football wide receiver. He played college football at East Mississippi before transferring to Ole Miss and was signed by the Dallas Cowboys as an undrafted free agent at the end of the 2022 NFL draft.

== Early life ==
Drummond grew up in Laurel, Mississippi, and attended Laurel High School. While in high school, he played baseball and basketball, as well as football, winning state championships with both his football and basketball teams. In four years in high school, Drummond accounted for 3474 all-purpose yards, and was a 3-star prospect.

== College career ==
=== East Mississippi CC ===
Drummond began his college career at East Mississippi Community College in Scooba, Mississippi. As a sophomore, he was named NJCAA All-American and led East Mississippi to the junior college national championships in 2017 and 2018. In two years at East Mississippi, he totaled 95 receptions, 1466 receiving yards, and 21 touchdowns.

=== Ole Miss ===
After two years at East Mississippi, Drummond transferred to Ole Miss. In his first year at Ole Miss, he finished third on the team with 13 receptions for 188 yards. In his junior season, Drummond caught 25 passes for 417 yards and seven touchdowns, helping Ole Miss to the 2021 Outback Bowl. In his senior year, he broke out, recording 76 receptions for 1028 yards and 8 touchdowns, including a career high 177 yards against Louisville in the season opener.

=== College statistics ===
Season	Team	GP	Receiving					Rushing		
Season	Team	GP	Rec	Yds	Avg	TD	Att	Yds	Avg	TD
2019	Ole Miss	8	13	188	14.5	0	0	0	0.0	0
2020	Ole Miss	9	25	417	16.7	7	0	0	0.0	0
2021	Ole Miss	12	76	1,028	13.5	8	6	40	6.7	1

== Professional career ==
Pre-draft measurables
Height	Weight	Arm length	Hand span	Wingspan	40-yard dash	10-yard split	20-yard split	20-yard shuttle	Three-cone drill	Vertical jump	Broad jump
6 ft 0 7/8 in (1.85 m)	215 lb (98 kg)	31 1/2 in (0.80 m)	9 1/4 in (0.23 m)	6 ft 4 3/8 in (1.94 m)	4.65 s	1.55 s	2.66 s	4.41 s	7.00 s	35.0 in (0.89 m)	10 ft 2 in (3.10 m)
All values from NFL Combine/Pro Day

=== Dallas Cowboys ===
Drummond signed with the Dallas Cowboys as an undrafted free agent on May 3, 2022. He was waived on August 30, 2022, and signed to the practice squad the next day. He signed a reserve/future contract on January 23, 2023. He was waived on August 29, 2023.

=== Calgary Stampeders ===
Drummond signed with the Calgary Stampeders of the Canadian Football League (CFL) on January 31, 2024. He was released on May 12, 2024.
