= West Jones High School =

Coordinates: 31°43′20″N 089°13′14″W

Location
- 254 Springhill Road; Soso, Mississippi 39443; United States

Information
- Established: 1965
- School district: Jones County School District
- Principal: Jordan Rogers (Supervising) Kacey Chandler (11th-12th) David Valentine (10th-9th grades) Ryan Hodge (8th-7th grades)
- Staff: 110.01 (FTE)
- Grades: 7–12
- Enrollment: 1,574 (2023-2024)
- Student to teacher ratio: 14.31
- Colors: Forest Green & Vegas Gold
- Athletics: Football, baseball, boys and girls basketball, softball, boys and girls golf, boys and girls tennis, boys and girls soccer, boys and girls swimming, girls and boys track, marching band
- Athletics conference: Division 5
- Mascot: Marty the Mustang
- Sports Class: 6A
- Website: wjh.jonesk12.org

West Jones High School, the "Home of the Mustangs," is a public school in Laurel, Mississippi, part of the Jones County School District. The school provides education to grades 7–12.

The school was named the state's Tech Prep Exemplary Site for 1975–2003 by the Tech Prep Exemplary Site Selection Committee.

The school is one of the biggest located in Jones County, hosting around fourteen hundred students. Due to the large student body, the school has renovated several times, with the Performing Arts Center, a new cafeteria, and new technology systems all being constructed within the last several years.

In the 2012–2013 school year, West Jones High School was classified as a "High Performing School" by the Mississippi Department of Education.

WJH is home to Lake Lotta Hockey. Several crappie tournaments are hosted at Lake Lotta Hockey throughout the year. Skidd's Lakeside Restaurant #1 is an American restaurant located on campus, on the banks of Lake Lotta Hockey.

== Notable alumni ==
- Stacey E. Pickering (Class of 1986) - State Auditor of Mississippi from 2008 to 2018.
- Byron Young, Professional Football Player for the Las Vegas Raiders
