= Laurel High School (Mississippi) =

Public high school in Laurel, Mississippi

Location
- 1100 W. 12th Street; Laurel, Mississippi 39440; United States; 31°42′13″N 089°08′23.7″W

Information
- Motto: All Students Will Learn
- School district: Laurel School District
- Principal: Dr. Christopher Mark
- Staff: 37.11 (FTE)
- Grades: 9–12
- Enrollment: 715 (2023–2024)
- Student to teacher ratio: 19.27
- Colors: Cardinal and gold
- Athletics: Football, baseball, boys' and girls' basketball, softball, boys' and girls' golf, boys' and girls' tennis, boys' and girls' soccer, boys' and girls' swimming, girls' and boys' track, marching band
- Athletics conference: Division 5
- Nickname: Golden Tornadoes
- Website: www.laurelschools.org/laurel-high-school/index

Laurel High School is a public school in Laurel, Mississippi, United States. It is part of the Laurel School District. The school provides education to grades 9–12.

In 2022, the school's enrollment was documented at about 710, with 87 percent African American, 8 percent Hispanic, and 3 percent white. 100 percent of students were categorized as economically disadvantaged.

The school's teams are known as the golden tornadoes. The football team won state championships in 1990, 2007, and 2014.

== Alumni ==
- Jeff Burkett – former American football player for the Chicago Cardinals
- Charles Cross – offensive tackle for the Seattle Seahawks of the NFL
- Akeem Davis – cornerbacks coach at University of Southern Mississippi, former National Football League (NFL) safety
- Dontario Drummond – wide receiver for the Dallas Cowboys of the NFL
- Mary Elizabeth Ellis – actor
- BoPete Keyes – cornerback for the Kansas City Chiefs of the NFL
- Tom Lester – actor
- Parker Posey – actor
