= Soso, Mississippi =

- Town
- Location of Soso, Mississippi

- Location in the United States
- Coordinates: 31°45′16″N 89°16′27″W
- Country: United States
- State: Mississippi
- County: Jones

Area
  - Total: 2.04 sq mi (5.28 km^{2})
  - Land: 2.03 sq mi (5.26 km^{2})
  - Water: 0.0039 sq mi (0.01 km^{2})
- Elevation: 315 ft (96 m)

Population (2020)
  - Total: 418
  - Density: 205.7/sq mi (79.43/km^{2})
- Time zone: UTC-6 (Central (CST))
  - Summer (DST): UTC-5 (CDT)
- ZIP code: 39480
- Area code: 601
- FIPS code: 28-69160

Soso is a town in Jones County, Mississippi, United States. The population was 418 at the 2020 census.

Paul Davis, a singer and songwriter from Meridian, Mississippi, wrote a song called "Sweet Magnolia Blues", which refers to Soso.

== History ==
According to tradition, the name "Soso" was derived from an old settler's common response to a question about how he was doing: "so-so".

After the Civil War, yeoman farmers returned to the area. The town developed a small mixed-race community. Among its notable residents was Unionist Newton Knight, who lived there mostly after the Reconstruction era with his wife Rachel and family. Knight was known for having led the Knight Company in and around Jones County during 1863 and 1864 in resistance to Confederate authorities, trying to protect local farmers. After the war he lived in Jasper County for a time, where he was active in the Republican Party. In 1872 he was appointed as a deputy U.S. Marshal for the Southern District. After Reconstruction ended, Knight retired from politics, as white Democrats took over county and state offices.

Rachel was a freedwoman who had aided the resistance. (In an historic photograph she appears to have been of mixed race.) She and Knight had several children together.

=== Tornado history ===
On April 12, 2020, Soso was struck by a 2.25-mile-wide EF4 tornado. It caused major damage to homes, churches, and the fire station. Numerous trees were snapped throughout town, the old elementary school was damaged, multiple buildings and churches in town were leveled and several homes were destroyed. The tornado's path mirrored that of a long-tracked F3 tornado that struck the south side of town on April 21, 1951, also causing severe damage.

== Geography ==
Soso is in northwestern Jones County at 31°45′16″N 89°16′27″W (31.754465, -89.274120). Mississippi Highway 28 passes through the center of town, leading southeast 5 miles (8 km) to U.S. Route 84 and northwest 10 miles (16 km) to Taylorsville. Laurel, the largest city in Jones County, is 10 miles southeast of Soso via Highways 28 and 84. Mississippi Highway 29 has its northern terminus in Soso and leads south 12 miles (19 km) to Ellisville.

According to the United States Census Bureau, Soso has an area of 2.1 square miles (5.5 km^{2}), of which 0.004 square miles (0.01 km^{2}), or 0.23%, is water.

== Government ==
Among government and public services, Soso is home to the Soso Volunteer Fire Department, the Soso Police Department, the Soso Town Hall, and the Soso Community Water Service.

== Demographics ==
Historical population
Census	Pop.	Note	%±
1910	162		—
1920	142		−12.3%
1930	214		50.7%
1980	434		—
1990	366		−15.7%
2000	379		3.6%
2010	408		7.7%
2020	418		2.5%
U.S. Decennial Census

Soso racial composition as of 2020 (NH = Non-Hispanic) (Note: Note: the US Census treats Hispanic/Latino as an ethnic category. This table excludes Latinos from the racial categories and assigns them to a separate category. Hispanics/Latinos can be of any race.)
Race	Number	Percentage
White (NH)	266	63.64%
Black or African American (NH)	97	23.21%
Native American or Alaska Native (NH)	1	0.24%
Some Other Race (NH)	1	0.24%
Mixed/Multi-Racial (NH)	5	1.2%
Hispanic or Latino	48	11.48%
Total	418	

As of the 2020 United States census, there were 418 people, 163 households, and 130 families residing in the town.

As of the census of 2010, there were 408 people, 160 households, and 116 families residing in the town. The population density was 189.7 inhabitants per square mile (73.2/km^{2}). There were 174 housing units at an average density of 87.1 per square mile (33.6/km^{2}). The racial makeup of the town was 79.2% White, 20.3% African American, and 0.5% from two or more races. Hispanic or Latino of any race were 2.2% of the population.

There were 157 households, of which 30.6% had children under the age of 18 living with them, 56.3% were married couples living together, 11.3% had a female householder with no husband present, and 27.5% were non-families. 27.5% of all households were made up of individuals, and 12.5% had someone living alone who was 65 years of age or older. The average household size was 2.55 and the average family size was 3.00.

In the town, the population was spread out, with 29.7% under the age of 19, 36.5% under the age of 50 and 33.8% over the age of 50

The data below is from the 2000 census.

The median income for a household in the town was $29,135, and the median income for a family was $31,346. Males had a median income of $19,231 versus $22,250 for females. The per capita income for the town was $15,455. About 15.7% of families and 15.0% of the population were below the poverty line, including 25.6% of those under age 18 and 21.3% of those age 65 or over.

== Education ==
Soso is served by the Jones County School District.

Elementary-aged students attend West Jones Elementary School, while middle and high school students attend West Jones Middle School and West Jones High School.

Jones County is in the zone of Jones College.
