= Thermon Blacklidge =

American basketball player

Personal information
- Born: March 19, 1920 Moselle, Mississippi
- Died: July 6, 1972 (aged 52) Jackson, Mississippi
- Listed height: 6 ft 3 in (1.91 m)
- Listed weight: 185 lb (84 kg)

Career information
- High school: Rainey (Rainey, Mississippi)
- College: Jones County JC (1937–1939); Delta State (1939–1941)
- Position: Forward

Career history
- 1941–1942: Sheboygan Red Skins

Thermon Talmadge "Blackie" Blacklidge (March 19, 1920 – July 6, 1972) was an American professional basketball player. He played for the Sheboygan Red Skins in the National Basketball League during the 1941–42 season and averaged 4.6 points per game. At Delta State University, he became the school's first ever men's basketball All-American.
