= Tawanta, Mississippi =

- Unincorporated community
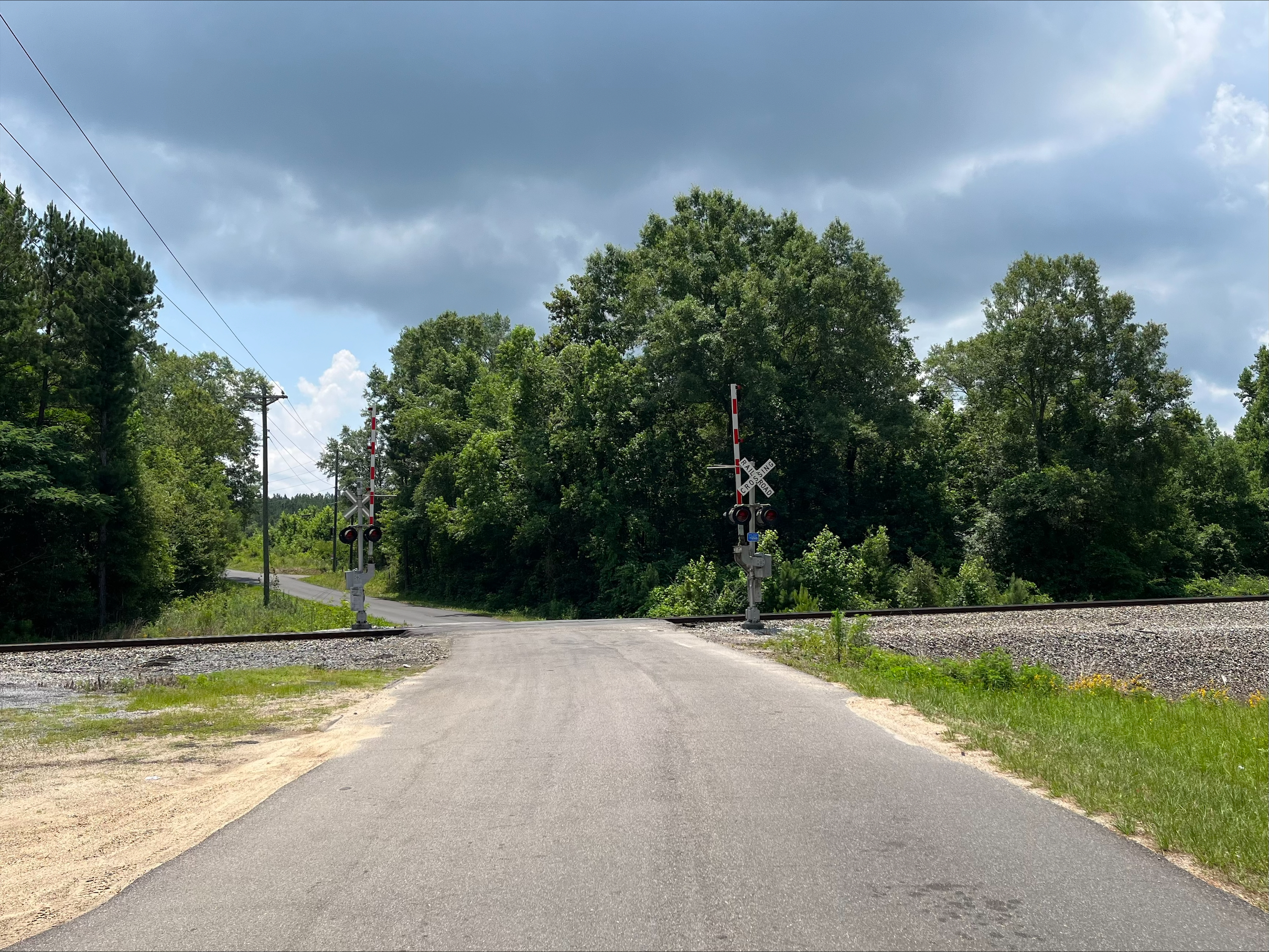
- Norfolk Southern Railway crossing in Tawanta

- Location within Mississippi Location within the United States
- Coordinates: 31°32′52″N 89°14′58″W
- Country: United States
- State: Mississippi
- County: Jones
- Elevation: 341 ft (104 m)
- Time zone: UTC-6 (Central (CST))
  - Summer (DST): UTC-5 (CDT)
- Area codes: 601 & 769
- GNIS feature ID: 692257

Tawanta is an unincorporated community in Jones County, in the U.S. state of Mississippi.

== History ==
Tawanta was founded in 1882. The name "Tawanta" is purported to mean "wide, broad" in the Choctaw language. The community was once a flag station and is located on the Norfolk Southern Railway.
