= Eastabuchie, Mississippi =

Community in Mississippi, United States

- Census-designated place
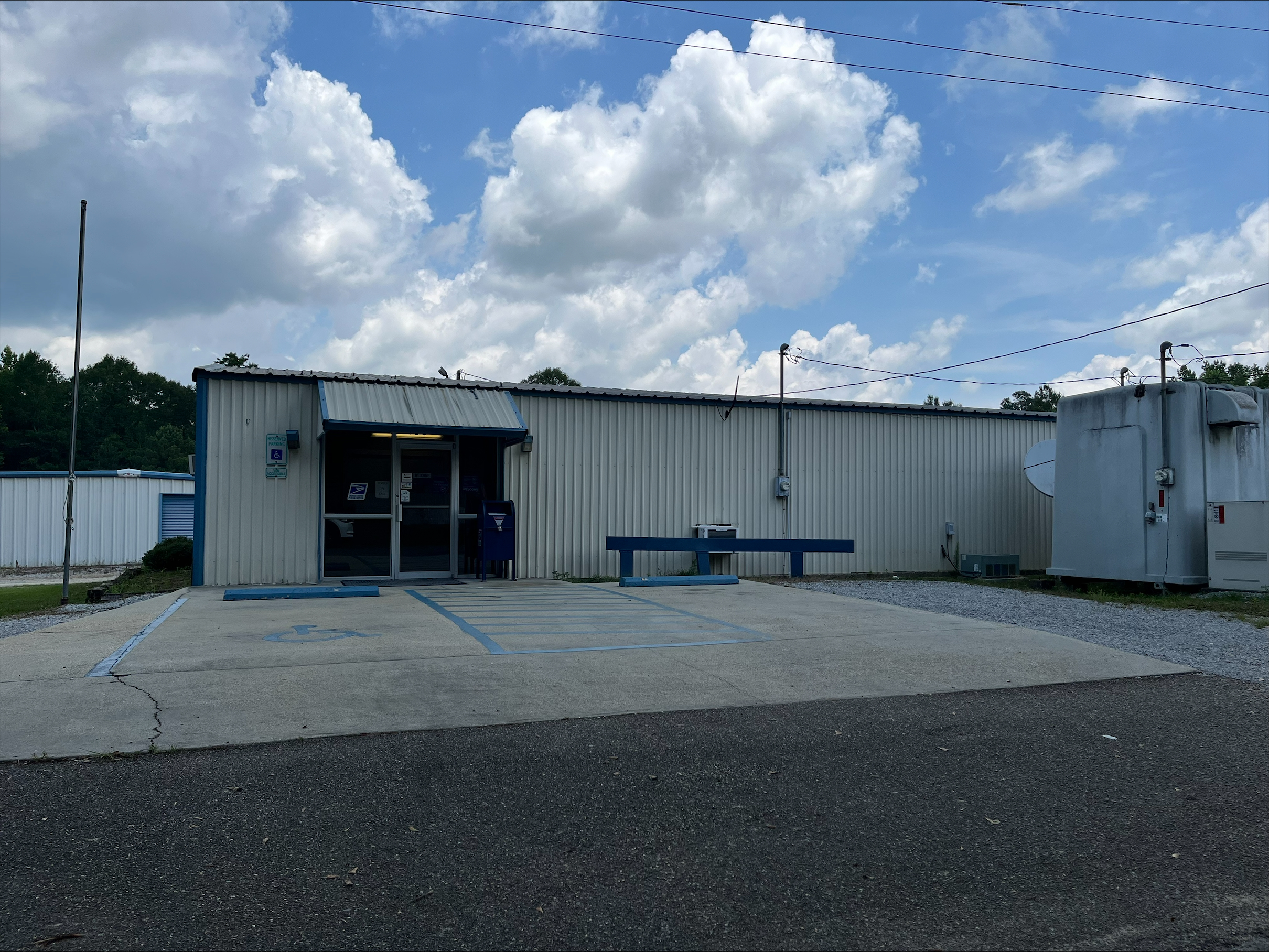
- Eastabuchie Post Office

- Location within Mississippi Location within the United States
- Coordinates: 31°26′08″N 89°17′00″W
- Country: United States
- State: Mississippi
- County: Jones

Area
  - Total: 1.90 sq mi (4.91 km^{2})
  - Land: 1.89 sq mi (4.89 km^{2})
  - Water: 0.0077 sq mi (0.02 km^{2})
- Elevation: 171 ft (52 m)

Population (2020)
  - Total: 187
  - Density: 99.1/sq mi (38.26/km^{2})
- Time zone: UTC-6 (Central (CST))
  - Summer (DST): UTC-5 (CDT)
- Area code: 601
- FIPS code: 28-20740
- GNIS feature ID: 669617

Eastabuchie is a census-designated place (CDP) and unincorporated community in southwestern Jones County, Mississippi. As of the 2020 census, Eastabuchie had a population of 187. It is located along U.S. Route 11, just north of the Forrest County line. The community has a post office with the ZIP code 39436. Eastabuchie is part of the Laurel Micropolitan Statistical Area.

== History ==
The name Eastabuchie is derived from a native Choctaw language term for the Leaf River.

Eastabuchie is located on the Norfolk Southern Railway and was incorporated on February 19, 1890. It was unincorporated at an unknown date.

It was first named as a CDP in the 2020 Census which listed a population of 187. The small, rural town is home to the studios of television station WDAM, the area's NBC and ABC affiliate.

In 1912, according to Frank Leslie's Weekly, several Confederate veterans lost their lives in a train wreck in Eastabuchie.

== Demographics ==
Historical population
Census	Pop.	Note	%±
2020	187		—
U.S. Decennial Census; 2020

Eastabuchie was first listed as a census designated place in the 2020 U.S. census.

=== 2020 census ===
Eastabuchie CDP, Mississippi – Racial and ethnic composition Note: the US Census treats Hispanic/Latino as an ethnic category. This table excludes Latinos from the racial categories and assigns them to a separate category. Hispanics/Latinos may be of any race.
Race / Ethnicity (NH = Non-Hispanic)	Pop 2020	% 2020
White alone (NH)	106	56.68%
Black or African American alone (NH)	70	37.43%
Native American or Alaska Native alone (NH)	1	0.53%
Asian alone (NH)	0	0.00%
Native Hawaiian or Pacific Islander alone (NH)	0	0.00%
Other race alone (NH)	0	0.00%
Mixed race or Multiracial (NH)	2	1.07%
Hispanic or Latino (any race)	8	4.28%
Total	187	100.00%

== Education ==
Public education in the Jones County section of Eastabuchie is provided by the Jones County School District. Campuses serving the community include Moselle Elementary School (Grades K–6) and South Jones High School (Grades 7–12).

In Forrest County portions, it is served by the Petal School District.

Jones County is in the zone of Jones College. Forrest County is in the zone of Pearl River Community College.

== Notable people ==
- John R. Baylis, chemist and sanitary engineer
- Noah Webster Overstreet, architect
