= Akeem Davis =

American football player (born 1989)

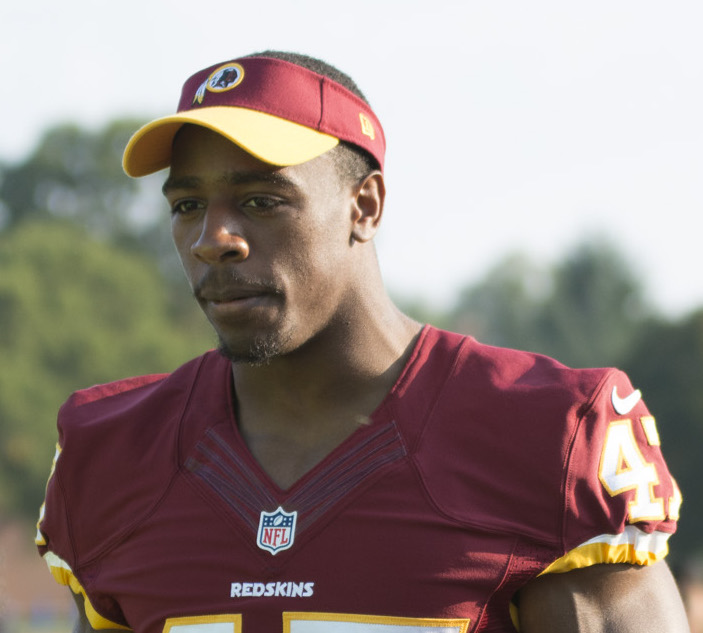
- Davis with the Washington Redskins in 2014

UNLV Rebels
- Title: Cornerbacks coach

Personal information
- Born: December 25, 1989 (age 36); Laurel, Mississippi, U.S.
- Listed height: 6 ft 1 in (1.85 m)
- Listed weight: 200 lb (91 kg)

Career information
- Position: Safety (No. 47, 30, 35)
- High school: Laurel
- College: Memphis
- NFL draft: 2013: undrafted

Career history

Playing
- Washington Redskins (2014); New Orleans Saints (2015); Tampa Bay Buccaneers (2015)*; Seattle Seahawks (2015); Indianapolis Colts (2015); Kansas City Chiefs (2016)*; Jacksonville Jaguars (2016)
- * Offseason or practice squad member only

Coaching
- Southern Miss (2017–2018) Graduate assistant; Southern Miss (2019) Cornerbacks coach; Southern Miss (2020) Running backs coach; Austin Peay (2021–2022) Co-defensive coordinator/defensive backs coach; UNLV (2023–present) Cornerbacks coach

Career NFL statistics
- Total tackles: 13
- Forced fumbles: 1
- Stats at Pro Football Reference

Akeem Davis (born December 25, 1989) is an American former professional football player who was a safety in the National Football League (NFL). He played college football for the Memphis Tigers, and signed with the Washington Redskins as an undrafted free agent in 2014. Davis was also a member of the New Orleans Saints, Tampa Bay Buccaneers, Seattle Seahawks, Indianapolis Colts, Kansas City Chiefs and Jacksonville Jaguars. He is currently the cornerbacks coach for UNLV.

== Early life ==
Davis is the son of Robert Davis and the late Karen Davis. He was born in Laurel, Mississippi. Davis was raised in the Queensburg community of Laurel, Mississippi. He started playing pee wee football under the coaching of Coach Howard. Davis attended Laurel High School where he played football, basketball and ran track. In football, he led Laurel to the Mississippi state 4A championship in 2007 after passing for over 2,600 yards and rushing for 926 yards, totalling 44 touchdowns. In his junior and senior seasons, he started at cornerback on defense and quarterback on offense. Academically, he graduated in the top-25 of his class with a 3.0 GPA.

In track & field, Davis competed in events ranging from the triple jump to the shot put during his junior and senior seasons. He ran the lead leg on the 4A state champion 4 × 200m relay squad in 2008, helping them capture the state title at 1.28.90 minutes. At the 2008 USM Invitational, he took 4th in the triple jump event with a mark of 13.7 meters (44 ft, 6 in).

== College career ==
Davis played the safety position at Memphis for three years. In 2012, he was converted to the linebacker position for his senior year. Davis tallied 150 tackles, 4 forced fumbles, 3 interceptions, and 2.5 sacks in his 4 years at Memphis.

== Professional career ==
Pre-draft measurables
Height	Weight	Arm length	Hand span	Wingspan	40-yard dash	10-yard split	20-yard split	20-yard shuttle	Three-cone drill	Vertical jump	Broad jump	Bench press
6 ft 0 1/8 in (1.83 m)	201 lb (91 kg)	30 3/8 in (0.77 m)	10 in (0.25 m)	6 ft 2 3/8 in (1.89 m)	4.37 s	1.54 s	2.49 s	4.27 s	7.05 s	39.5 in (1.00 m)	10 ft 6 in (3.20 m)	19 reps
All values from Pro Day

=== Washington Redskins ===
After going unselected in the 2013 NFL draft, Davis had a try-out at the Seattle Seahawks rookie mini-camp. He was not offered a contract and was not signed by any other team in the 2013 season. While not playing football, Davis became a graduate assistant coach at Memphis University. The Washington Redskins signed Davis on April 10, 2014, after not playing football for a year. While placed as a reserve strong safety, he established himself on special teams in the preseason. The events of Davis's life before making an NFL roster, were filmed for an NFL Network series, "Undrafted". Davis was the only one out of 6 undrafted prospects to be signed to an NFL 53-man roster.

Despite making the active roster by the final roster cut day, the Redskins waived him on August 31 after Duke Ihenacho was claimed off waivers. The Redskins placed Davis on the practice squad the next day. He was waived on October 7, but re-signed with their practice squad the next day. He was added to the active roster on October 26, 2014.

On September 4, 2015, Davis was waived with an injury settlement for final roster cuts before the start of the regular season.

=== New Orleans Saints ===
Davis signed with the New Orleans Saints' practice squad on October 19, 2015. He was promoted to the active roster on October 24. He was waived on November 3.

=== Tampa Bay Buccaneers ===
On November 10, 2015, Davis signed with the practice squad of the Tampa Bay Buccaneers. On November 17, 2015, he was released. He was re-signed to the practice squad on November 25, 2015. On December 1, 2015, he was released from practice squad.

=== Seattle Seahawks ===
On December 8, 2015, Davis signed with the Seattle Seahawks. On December 15, 2015, Davis was waived.

=== Indianapolis Colts ===
On December 16, 2015, the Indianapolis Colts claimed Davis off of waivers from Seattle.

=== Kansas City Chiefs ===
On June 16, 2016, Davis signed a contract with the Kansas City Chiefs. He was waived on August 17, 2016.

=== Jacksonville Jaguars ===
On October 10, 2016, Davis was signed to the Jacksonville Jaguars practice squad. He was promoted to the active roster on December 23, 2016. On May 15, 2017, he was waived by the Jaguars.

== Coaching career ==
Davis, a Southern Miss defensive graduate assistant from 2017 to 2018, was promoted to cornerbacks coach in Spring 2019.

On December 17, 2020, Davis was announced as a co-defensive coordinator and defensive backs coach on new head coach Scotty Walden's inaugural staff at Austin Peay.

== Personal life ==
Davis married his high school Sweetheart, Sierra Sky Davis. Davis has one daughter, Carsyn, who was born on July 31, 2014, and one Son Corinthian Akeem Davis II. Davis is also the founder of the AD47 Football Leadership Academy. The AD47 Football Leadership Academy is a free, one-day, football skills camp, created by NFL DB, Akeem Davis, and dedicated to promoting leadership, citizenship, and healthy lifestyles. AD47 is sanctioned and insured by the NFL Foundation and run in partnership with USA Football through the FUNdamentals program. The inaugural AD47 was held in Laurel, MS in June 2015, and featured 53 school children, ages 8–12 from across the greater Laurel region. Davis is a Christian.
