= Laurel Black Cats =

Semi-professional baseball team in Mississippi

The Laurel Black Cats are a semi-professional baseball team located in Queensburg, Laurel, Mississippi. One of Mississippi's original Independent Negro league's charter franchises, the club was founded in 1932 by Dayton Hair. Negro leaguers such as Hank Aaron, Willie Mays, Satchel Paige, Piper Davis, Lester Lockett, Artie Wilson and Ed Steele are among the many players to play for the Black Cats. Games were held on Sundays always starting at 3:00 pm so that fans could attend after church. From the 1930s to the 60s, the Black Cats' home ballpark was Rahaim Park, located in the KC Community. In the 1990s, they moved to the Queensburg Community, where they remain. The Black Cats have achieved widespread popularity and a dedicated fan base. Their rivalry with the Hattiesburg Black Sox is arguably the fiercest and most historic in the state of Mississippi semi-pro baseball. After sending several players to college and other Negro league franchises, the team was disbanded in 2006 but later returned in 2010 when former Jones County Junior College assistant baseball coach Jody P. Babineaux took ownership and management of the club. In 2016 the team won a state championship.

== Origins ==
In 1932, a local African American businessman by the name of Dayton Hair, whose business enterprises included real estate, insurance, rental collection agency, the Black Cat Inn and the Black Cat Taxi Service, ventured in sports by bringing James "Lefty" Bell to Laurel from Livingston, Alabama, and together they organized the Laurel Black Cats Baseball team. Hair drew players from all over the south exclusively to showcase their playing talent. He put together a formidable collection of all-black talent, including pitcher James "Lefty" Bell who established himself as one of the most popular stars of the Independent Negro league. Immediate contenders, the Black Cats became bitter rivals to the Hattiesburg Black Sox.

== Managed by A.W. Watson ==
In the 1940s and 50s, manager Aaron "A.W." Watson took over as player/manager. He kept up the Black Cat's tradition, as the team's staff over the next few years featured James "Lefty" Bell, Willie McNeil, Walter Charles "W.C." Crosby, W.P. Noble, A.D. Chamber, Joe Grace, Edward Payton, Bombet Boston, J.D. Lewis, Hack Afterberry, Afonso Dunn and Ted Nicholson who was selected 3rd in the Major League Baseball Draft. Under the management of Watson, the Black Cats spent several years as an independent team, mostly barnstorming throughout the south. As baseball gradually desegregated in the late 1940s and 1950s, the Black Cats developed a niche as the foremost developer of black talent for local colleges and professional baseball teams. They frequently had players that toured with Negro league franchises such as the Kansas City Monarchs, Birmingham Black Barons, and Memphis Red Sox and in the 1969 Major League Baseball Draft had a player by the name of Ted Nicholson selected 3rd overall pick by the Chicago White Sox.

== Managed by W.C. Jones ==
After decades of winning seasons, Watson step down as manager due to personal illness.

In honor of A.W. Watson's years of managing the club the City of Laurel named the field in Queensburg after him, as "A.W. Watson Field". W.C. Jones, who played for Watson, succeeded him as manager of the team. Under the leadership of Jones the team continued the tradition of barnstorming throughout the south posting winning seasons each year. Though the Jackson Metro Baseball League (JMBL) had begun to form in the state, Jones kept the Black Cats as an independent team playing local Mississippi community teams such as Bay Springs, Heidelberg, Paulding, and Meridian. After remaining rivals with the Hattiesburg Black Sox for half of a century, the rivalry would come to an end under Jones due to a personal disagreement with Hattiesburg's owner Trey Aby. W.C. Jones stayed at the helm through the 2005 season but later stepped down from running the club due to lack player participation and illness. The Laurel Black Cats ceased operations in 2006, but later returned in 2010 when former Jones County Junior College assistant baseball coach Jody P. Babineaux took ownership and management of the club.
