= BoPete Keyes =

American football player (born 1997)

Profile
- Position: Cornerback

Personal information
- Born: November 9, 1997 (age 28); Laurel, Mississippi, U.S.
- Listed height: 6 ft 1 in (1.85 m)
- Listed weight: 200 lb (91 kg)

Career information
- High school: Laurel
- College: Tulane (2016–2019)
- NFL draft: 2020: 7th round, 237th overall pick

Career history
- Kansas City Chiefs (2020); Indianapolis Colts (2021); New England Patriots (2021)*; Chicago Bears (2021); Houston Texans (2022)*; Atlanta Falcons (2022)*; Houston Texans (2022)*; Baltimore Ravens (2022)*; Cleveland Browns (2023)*; San Antonio Brahmas (2024–2025); Montreal Alouettes (2026)*; Calgary Stampeders (2026)
- * Offseason or practice squad member only

Career NFL statistics
- Total tackles: 9
- Stats at Pro Football Reference

Thakarius "BoPete" Keyes (born November 9, 1997) is an American professional football cornerback. He played college football at Tulane, and was selected by the Kansas City Chiefs in the seventh round of the 2020 NFL draft. He has also been a member of the Indianapolis Colts, New England Patriots, Chicago Bears, Houston Texans, Atlanta Falcons, Baltimore Ravens, and Cleveland Browns.

== College career ==
According to WGNO, in 2019, Keyes started every game for Tulane and held opposing quarterbacks to a 45 percent completion rate when he was targeted. He earned an Honorable Mention for the American Athletic Conference. In his junior and senior seasons, Keyes had 85 tackles, 18 passes defended and two interceptions.

== Professional career ==
=== Kansas City Chiefs ===
Keyes was selected by the Kansas City Chiefs in the seventh round of the 2020 NFL draft with the 237th overall pick. He was placed on the active/non-football injury list on July 26. Keyes was activated on August 16. He finished his rookie season playing in eight games and recording eight total tackles. On August 31, 2021, Keyes was waived by the Chiefs.

=== Indianapolis Colts ===
On September 1, 2021, Keyes was claimed off waivers by the Indianapolis Colts. He was waived on November 13 and re-signed to the practice squad. Keyes was released by the Colts on November 22.

=== New England Patriots ===
On November 30, 2021, Keyes was signed to the New England Patriots' practice squad, but was released the next day.

=== Chicago Bears ===
On December 15, 2021, Keyes was signed to the Chicago Bears practice squad. He signed a reserve/future contract with the Bears on January 11, 2022. Keyes was waived on August 23.

=== Houston Texans (first stint) ===
On September 13, 2022, Keyes was signed to the Houston Texans' practice squad. He was released on October 18.

=== Atlanta Falcons ===
On October 25, 2022, Keyes was signed to the Atlanta Falcons' practice squad. He was released on November 8.

=== Houston Texans (second stint) ===
On November 17, 2022, Keyes was signed to the Houston Texans' practice squad. He was released later that day.

=== Baltimore Ravens ===
On December 7, 2022, Keyes was signed to the Baltimore Ravens' practice squad. He signed a reserve/future contract with Baltimore on January 16, 2023. On May 12, Keyes was waived by the Ravens.

=== Cleveland Browns ===
On July 6, 2023, Keyes was signed by the Cleveland Browns. He was waived by Cleveland on July 29.

=== San Antonio Brahmas ===
On February 25, 2024, Keyes signed with he San Antonio Brahmas of the United Football League (UFL). He re-signed with the team on August 27. Keyes was released on May 14, 2025.

=== Montreal Alouettes ===
On January 28, 2026 Keyes signed with the Montreal Alouettes of the Canadian Football League (CFL). He was released on May 31, 2026.

=== Calgary Stampeders ===
On July 8, 2026, Keyes signed with the Calgary Stampeders. He was released at the end of the season.
