= Hattiesburg–Laurel Regional Airport =

Airport in Mississippi, US

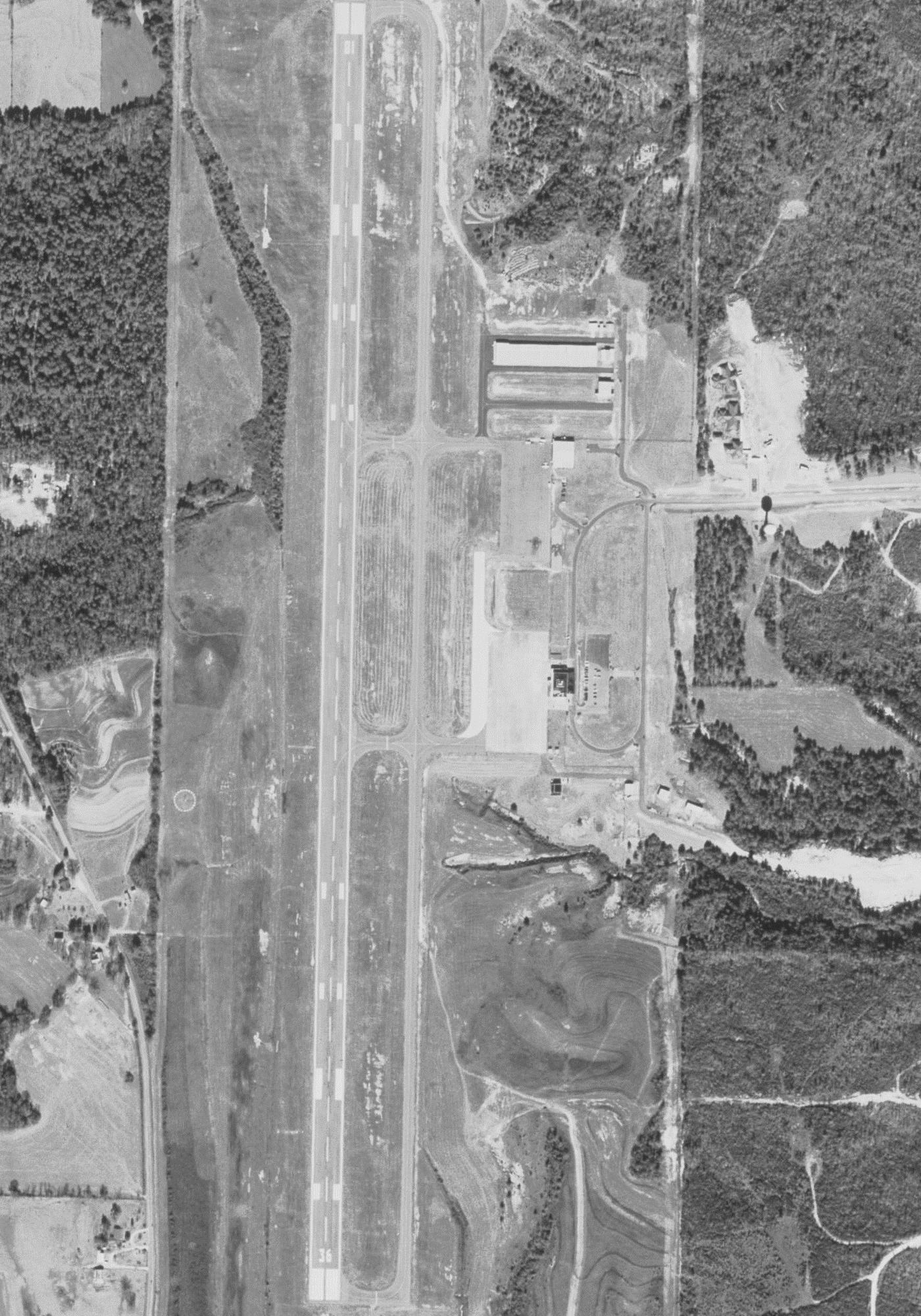
- USGS 1996 orthophoto
- IATA: PIB; ICAO: KPIB; FAA LID: PIB

Summary
- Airport type: Public
- Owner: Regional Airport Authority
- Serves: Hattiesburg-Laurel, Mississippi, U.S.
- Location: Jones County, Mississippi, U.S. Moselle postal address (not in the CDP)
- Elevation AMSL: 298 ft (91 m)
- Coordinates: 31°28′02″N 089°20′13″W
- Website: www.FlyPIB.com

Map
- Location of airport in Mississippi PIB (the United States)

Runways
Direction	Length		Surface
Direction	ft	m	Surface
18/36	6,502	1,982	Asphalt

Statistics (2022)
- Aircraft operations (year ending 3/1/2022): 37,560
- Based aircraft: 58
- Source: Federal Aviation Administration

Hattiesburg–Laurel Regional Airport (IATA: PIB, ICAO: KPIB, FAA LID: PIB), nicknamed Airport City, is a public airport located in unincorporated Jones County, Mississippi, United States.

The airport is adjacent to Interstate 59, approximately nine nautical miles (10 mi, 17 km) northeast of Hattiesburg and 23 miles southwest of Laurel. It is mostly used for general aviation, but is also served by one commercial airline, United Express. Scheduled passenger service is currently subsidized by the federal Essential Air Service (EAS) program.

The runway is long enough to handle Boeing 757s and Boeing 767s chartered by college football teams visiting Hattiesburg to play at the University of Southern Mississippi.

The airport's IATA code (PIB) refers to its former name, Pine Belt Regional Airport.

Hattiesburg is located halfway between Mississippi's two major airports – Gulfport–Biloxi International Airport in Gulfport and Jackson–Evers International Airport in Jackson. The three cities are linked by the four-lane U.S. Highway 49.

As per the Federal Aviation Administration, this airport had 12,576 passenger boardings (enplanements) in calendar year 2008, 12,972 in 2009, and 13,766 in 2010. The National Plan of Integrated Airport Systems for 2011–2015 categorized it as a primary commercial service airport.

== Facilities and aircraft ==
The airport is located in unincorporated Jones County. The airport has a Moselle postal address, but it is not located in the Moselle census-designated place.

Hattiesburg–Laurel Regional Airport covers an area of 1,170 acres (473 ha) at an elevation of 298 feet (91 m) above mean sea level. It has one runway designated 18/36 with an asphalt surface measuring 6,502 by 150 feet (1,982 x 46 m).

For the 12-month period ending March 1, 2022, the airport had 37,560 aircraft operations, an average of 103 per day: 95% general aviation, 4% scheduled commercial, and <1% military. At that time 58 aircraft were based at this airport: 41 single-engine, 8 multi-engine, 8 jet, and 1 helicopter.

In late 2011 the airport began an extensive refurbishment of the main terminal building.

In early 2022, FedEx Ground announced it would begin construction on a $12 million distribution center in the airport. The project will add over 200 jobs and cover over 200,000 square feet of space.

== Historical airline service ==
Southern Airways had begun serving Laurel by 1955 with Douglas DC-3 aircraft flying a daily round trip routing of Memphis - Greenville - Vicksburg - Jackson - Laurel - Gulfport - Mobile. By 1960, Southern was serving both Laurel and Hattiesburg as each city had its own airport at this time with the respective three letter airport codes being LUL and HBG according to the airline's system timetable with Southern operating daily round trip DC-3 service on a routing of Atlanta - Anniston - Birmingham - Selma - Meridian - Laurel - Hattiesburg - Gulfport - New Orleans.

The new Hattiesburg-Laurel Regional Airport (PIB) opened in July, 1974 and Southern began operating all of its flights from this airport with Douglas DC-9-10 jets with two daily flights operated on round trip routings of Atlanta - Birmingham - Meridian - Hattiesburg/Laurel - New Orleans. There was also one Memphis - Columbus - Meridian - Hattiesburg/Laurel round trip flight.

Southern Airways then merged with North Central Airlines to form Republic Airlines which in turn was continuing to serve the airport in 1979 with Douglas DC-9-10 jets as well as with larger McDonnell Douglas DC-9-50 jets in addition to Convair 580 turboprop aircraft with nonstop and direct one stop DC-9 flights from Atlanta, nonstop Convair 580 flights from New Orleans, direct one stop Convair 580 flights from Memphis, and nonstop DC-9 and Convair 580 flights from Meridian. Also in 1979, Universal Airways, a commuter airline, was operating nonstop service between the airport and New Orleans with three round trip flights every weekday operated with small Beechcraft 99 turboprops. Republic was continuing to provide scheduled passenger service into PIB in the summer of 1984; however, according to its April 28, 1985 route map the airline was no longer serving the airport by this time.

Two regional airlines were serving the airport in late 1989 including the Delta Connection operated by Atlantic Southeast Airlines (ASA) on behalf of Delta Air Lines on a code sharing basis with direct one stop Embraer EMB-120 Brasilia turboprop flights from Atlanta via Meridian, and Northwest Airlink operated by Express Airlines I on behalf of Northwest Airlines on a code sharing basis with direct one stop British Aerospace BAe Jetstream 31 and Saab 340 turboprop flights from Memphis also via Meridian.

By the spring of 1995, Northwest Airlink was the only airline serving the airport with nonstop and direct one stop flights from Memphis as well as nonstop flights from Jackson, Meridian, and Tupelo operated with BAe Jetstream 31 and Saab 340 turboprops.

== Airline and destinations ==
Airlines	Destinations
United Express	Houston–Intercontinental

Destinations map
Destinations from Hattiesburg–Laurel Regional Airport

=== Statistics ===
Top domestic destinations: (May 2024 – April 2025)
Rank	Airport name	Passengers	Airline
1	Houston–Intercontinental	14,270	United Express
2	Meridian	180	United Express

== Non-scheduled and charter service ==
With its close proximity to the University of Southern Mississippi, the airport sees numerous charters operated with such jetliners as the Airbus A320 and Boeing 737 transporting teams to and from athletic events.

== See also ==
- List of airports in Mississippi

== Other sources ==
- Essential Air Service documents (Docket DOT-OST-2001-10685) from the U.S. Department of Transportation:
  - Notice of Termination of Service (September 21, 2001): Express Airlines I d/b/a Northwest Airlink submits notice of its intent to terminate service to Laurel/Hattiesburg, Mississippi, effective January 1, 2002.
  - Order 2002-5-28 (June 3, 2002): selects Mesaba Aviation, Inc., d/b/a Northwest Airlink, to provide two nonstop round trips a day between Laurel/Hattiesburg, Mississippi, and Memphis beginning when the carrier inaugurates service at an annual subsidy rate of $1,056,991.
  - Order 2004-8-11 (August 17, 2004): re-selecting Mesaba Aviation, Inc., d/b/a Northwest Airlink, to provide essential air service (EAS) at Laurel/Hattiesburg, Mississippi, for the period from July 1, 2004, through June 30, 2006, at an annual subsidy rate of $1,100,253.
  - Order 2006-6-7 (June 9, 2006): re-selecting Mesaba Aviation, Inc., d/b/a Northwest Airlink, to provide essential air service (EAS) at Laurel/Hattiesburg, Mississippi, for the two-year period beginning July 1, 2006, at an annual subsidy rate of $917,129.
  - Order 2008-4-2 (April 4, 2008): re-selecting Mesaba Aviation, Inc., d/b/a Northwest Airlink, to provide subsidized essential air service (EAS) at the hyphenated communities of Hattiesburg and Laurel, Mississippi, through the Hattiesburg–Laurel Regional Airport for the two-year period beginning July 1, 2008, for an annual subsidy of $1,191,435 with 34-seat Saab 340 turboprop aircraft.
  - Order 2010-5-16 (May 13, 2010): selecting Mesaba Aviation, Inc. d/b/a Delta Connection, to continue providing subsidized essential air service (EAS) at Laurel/Hattiesburg, Mississippi, for the two-year period beginning July 1, 2010, at the annual subsidy rate of $1,398,798.
  - Ninety Day Notice (July 15, 2011): from MESABA AVIATION, INC. and PINNACLE AIRLINES, INC. of termination of service at Laurel/Hattiesburg, MS.
  - Order 2012-5-17 (May 22, 2012): selecting Silver Airways, formerly Gulfstream International Airways, to provide Essential Air Service (EAS) at Muscle Shoals, Alabama, Greenville, Laurel/Hattiesburg, and Tupelo, Mississippi, and Greenbrier/White Sulphur Springs, West Virginia (Lewisburg), using 34-passenger Saab 340 aircraft, for a combined annual subsidy of $16,098,538.
  - Order 2012-6-3 (June 6, 2012): extending the Essential Air Service obligation of the two wholly owned subsidiaries of Pinnacle Airlines Corporation—Mesaba Aviation, Inc. and Pinnacle Airlines, d/b/a Delta Connection at the eight communities listed below (Muscle Shoals, AL; Alpena, MI; Iron Mountain/Kingsford, MI; Brainerd, MN; International Falls, MN; Greenville, MS; Laurel/Hattiesburg, MS; Tupelo, MS) for 30 days, through, July 9, 2012.
  - Notice of Intent (April 9, 2014): of Silver Airways Corp. ... to discontinue subsidized scheduled air service between Atlanta, Georgia (ATL) and each of Muscle Shoals, Alabama (MSL), Greenville, Mississippi (GLH), Laurel/Hattiesburg, Mississippi (PIB), and Tupelo, Mississippi (TUP). Silver Airways intends to discontinue this service on July 8, 2014 or such earlier date as permitted by the Department in any final order terminating the eligibility of any of these communities under the essential air service (EAS) program.
  - Order 2014-4-24 (April 22, 2014): prohibits Silver Airways Corp., from terminating service at Muscle Shoals, Alabama, Greenville, Laurel/Hattiesburg, Meridian, and Tupelo, Mississippi, for 30 days beyond the end of the air carrier’s 90-day notice period, i.e. August 7, 2014. We are also requesting proposals from air carriers interested in providing Essential Air Service (EAS) at Muscle Shoals, Greenville, Laurel/Hattiesburg, Meridian, and/or Tupelo.
