= Kenny Payne =

American basketball player and coach (born 1966)

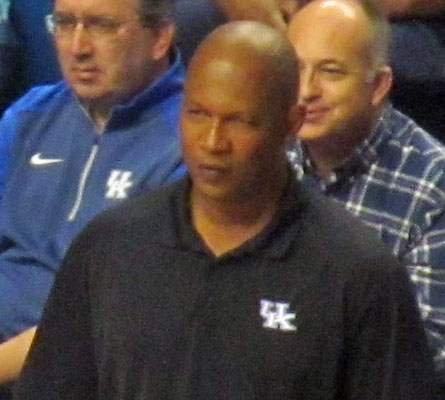

Arkansas Razorbacks
- Title: Associate head coach
- Conference: Southeastern Conference

Personal information
- Born: November 25, 1966 (age 59) Laurel, Mississippi, U.S.
- Listed height: 6 ft 8 in (2.03 m)
- Listed weight: 195 lb (88 kg)

Career information
- High school: Northeast Jones (Laurel, Mississippi)
- College: Louisville (1985–1989)
- NBA draft: 1989: 1st round, 19th overall pick
- Drafted by: Philadelphia 76ers
- Playing career: 1989–2000
- Position: Small forward
- Number: 21
- Coaching career: 2004–present

Career history

Playing
- 1989–1993: Philadelphia 76ers
- 1993: Virtus Roma
- 1993–1994: Tri-City Chinook
- 1995–1997: Japan
- 1998: Flamengo
- 1999–2000: Beijing Ducks
- 2000: Libertad Sunchales
- 2000: Cairns Taipans

Coaching
- 2004–2009: Oregon (assistant)
- 2010–2014: Kentucky (assistant)
- 2014–2020: Kentucky (Associate HC)
- 2020–2022: New York Knicks (assistant)
- 2022–2024: Louisville
- 2024–present: Arkansas (Associate HC)

Career highlights
- As player: NCAA champion (1986); Second-team Parade All-American (1985); Mississippi Mr. Basketball (1985); As assistant coach: NCAA champion (2012); 7x SEC tournament winner (2010, 2011, 2015–2018,2026); Pac-10 tournament winner (2007)
- Stats at NBA.com
- Stats at Basketball Reference

Kenneth Victor Payne (born November 25, 1966) is an American college basketball coach and former player who is currently the associate head coach at the University of Arkansas. Previously, he was the head coach at the University of Louisville. Prior to being hired at Louisville, Payne spent two seasons as an assistant coach with the New York Knicks of the National Basketball Association (NBA). A 6 ft 8 in (2.03 m) and 195 lb (88 kg) small forward, Payne played college basketball at Louisville and was a member of the 1986 NCAA championship squad. He was selected by the Philadelphia 76ers with the 19th pick of the 1989 NBA draft.

== Playing career ==
Payne played for the University of Louisville from 1986 to 1989, winning a national title as a freshman in a victory over Duke. As a starter his last two years at Louisville, he averaged 10.7 points and 5 rebounds as junior, and 14.5 points and 5.7 rebounds as senior, while shooting 51% from the field, including 43% on 3-pointers. His last season, Louisville won the Metro Conference tournament and was rated 12th in the final poll and the team made it to the Sweet 16.

In four NBA seasons from 1989 to 1993 for the Philadelphia 76ers, he averaged 3.5 points and 1.2 rebounds per game. He was waived by the team in January 1993 because the GM did not think that he would be part of the regular rotation anymore to save $250,000 from being paid to him. He also played professionally overseas in Italy, Japan, Brazil, the Philippines, Cyprus, China, Argentina and Australia. Following his NBA stint, Payne played one season in the Continental Basketball Association (CBA) in 1993–94, averaging 16.3 points and 6.3 rebounds per game for the Tri-City Chinook.

== Coaching career ==
Payne served as assistant coach for the University of Oregon from 2004 to 2009. From 2010 to 2014, Payne served as assistant coach for the University of Kentucky; from 2014 to 2020, he was the associate head coach. In 2012, Payne met with Mississippi State University's athletic director about its men's basketball team's head coach vacancy, though ultimately he was not hired.

On August 11, 2020, the New York Knicks hired Payne as assistant coach under head coach Tom Thibodeau.

On March 18, 2022, Payne was introduced as the new head men's basketball coach at the University of Louisville. He finished his first year as head coach with only four wins, the worst record in modern history for any Louisville basketball team.

During the fall of 2023 there was frustration and anger among fanbase, with members calling for Payne's termination with an open petition, a website, trending social media posts, and a song called "Fire Kenny Payne" by Jonathan Hay.

Payne won his first road game on January 10, 2024, defeating Miami.

After the 2023–24 season, Louisville fired Payne. Payne finished his two seasons in charge with a 12–52 overall record and a 5–35 conference record. The Cardinals finished last in the ACC in both seasons where Payne was head coach.

A month after being fired, Payne was hired as an associate head coach at Arkansas.

== Head coaching record ==
Record table
Season	Team	Overall	Conference	Standing	Postseason
Louisville Cardinals (Atlantic Coast Conference) (2022–2024)
2022–23	Louisville	4–28	2–18	15th	
2023–24	Louisville	8–24	3–17	15th	
Louisville:		12–52 (.188)	5–35 (.125)		
Total:		12–52 (.188)			
National champion Postseason invitational champion Conference regular season champion Conference regular season and conference tournament champion Division regular season champion Division regular season and conference tournament champion Conference tournament champion

== Personal life ==
Payne and his wife Michelle have two children. One of his children, Zan, was a player for the Louisville Cardinals men's basketball team.
