= Sharon, Jones County, Mississippi =

- Census-designated place
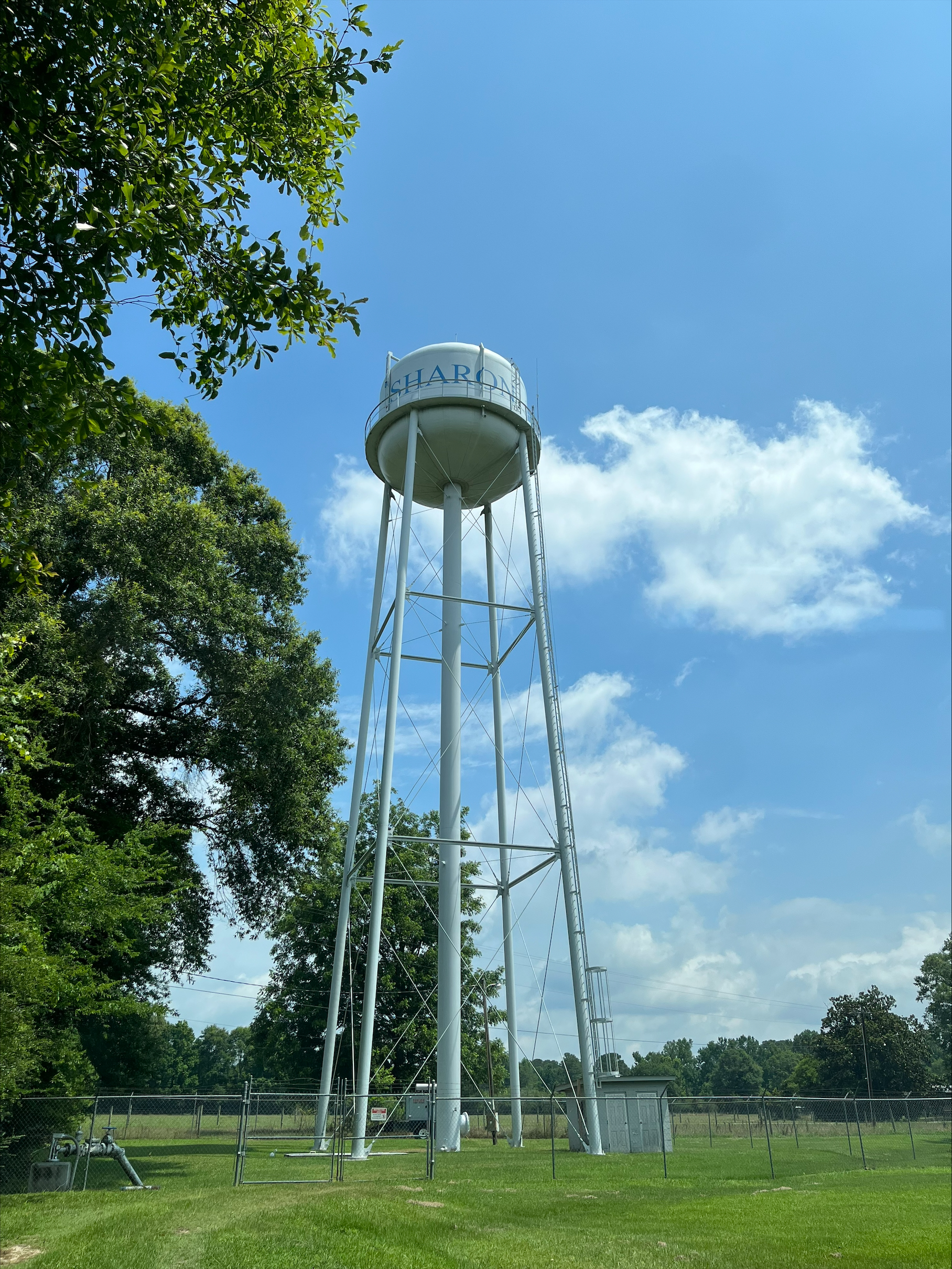
- Water tower in Sharon

- Location within Mississippi Location within the United States
- Coordinates: 31°47′22″N 89°5′54″W
- Country: United States
- State: Mississippi
- County: Jones

Area
  - Total: 8.58 sq mi (22.23 km^{2})
  - Land: 8.56 sq mi (22.18 km^{2})
  - Water: 0.015 sq mi (0.04 km^{2})
- Elevation: 315 ft (96 m)

Population (2020)
  - Total: 1,344
  - Density: 156.9/sq mi (60.59/km^{2})
- Time zone: UTC-6 (Central (CST))
  - Summer (DST): UTC-5 (CDT)
- Area code: 601
- FIPS code: 28-66840
- GNIS feature ID: 0677615

Sharon is an unincorporated community and census-designated place (CDP) in Jones County, Mississippi, United States. The population was 1,344 at the 2020 census. It is part of the Laurel micropolitan statistical area.

== Geography ==
Sharon is in northeastern Jones County and is bordered to the north by Jasper County. It is 7 miles (11 km) north of Laurel, the largest city in Jones County.

According to the United States Census Bureau, the Sharon CDP has a total area of 8.6 square miles (22.2 km^{2}), of which 0.02 square miles (0.04 km^{2}), or 0.20%, are water.

== Demographics ==
Historical population
Census	Pop.	Note	%±
2020	1,344		—
U.S. Decennial Census

Sharon first appeared as a census designated place in the 2010 U.S. census.

Sharon racial composition as of 2020 (NH = Non-Hispanic) (Note: Note: the US Census treats Hispanic/Latino as an ethnic category. This table excludes Latinos from the racial categories and assigns them to a separate category. Hispanics/Latinos can be of any race.)
Race	Number	Percentage
White (NH)	1,159	86.24%
Black or African American (NH)	122	9.08%
Native American or Alaska Native (NH)	1	0.07%
Asian (NH)	1	0.07%
Some Other Race (NH)	1	0.07%
Mixed/Multi-Racial (NH)	28	2.08%
Hispanic or Latino	32	2.38%
Total	1,344	

As of the 2020 United States census, there were 1,344 people, 591 households, and 505 families residing in the CDP.

== Education ==
Residents are in the Jones County School District.

Jones County is in the zone of Jones College.
