= Cody Prewitt =

American football player (born 1992)

Profile
- Position: Safety

Personal information
- Born: December 31, 1992 (age 33); Bay Springs, Mississippi, U.S.
- Listed height: 6 ft 2 in (1.88 m)
- Listed weight: 212 lb (96 kg)

Career information
- High school: Sylva Bay Academy (Bay Springs)
- College: Ole Miss
- NFL draft: 2015: undrafted

Career history
- Tennessee Titans (2015)*
- * Offseason or practice squad member only

Awards and highlights
- First-team All-American (2013); Second-team All-American (2014); First-team All-SEC (2013, 2014)
- Stats at Pro Football Reference

Cody Prewitt (born December 31, 1992) is an American former professional football player who was a safety in the National Football League (NFL). He played college football for the Ole Miss Rebels.

== Early life ==
Prewitt was born in Bay Springs, Mississippi.

Prewitt attended South Jones High School in Ellisville, Mississippi and Sylva Bay Academy in Bay Springs, where he played football and ran track. He collected 121 tackles and eight interceptions as a senior, while adding 2,406 rushing yards and 41 touchdowns. He accounted for 3,200 all-purpose yards during his senior season, helping lead his team to a 12-1 record and MAIS state semifinals.

In track & field, he was a standout sprinter and jumper. At the 2010 MAIS South Half Meet, he captured three state titles, winning the high jump, with a jump of 1.98 meters, the 100 meters, with a PR of 10.75 seconds, and the 200 meters, with a time of 21.84 seconds. He recorded a career-best time of 21.56 seconds in the 200 meters at the 2010 MAIS Overall State Meet Championships. At the 2011 MAIS Overall Meet, he placed first in the triple jump, setting a personal-best mark of 14.14 meters.

Considered a four-star recruit by Rivals.com, he was rated as the 16th best athlete prospect of his class.

== College career ==
Prewitt accepted a scholarship from the University of Mississippi and played immediately as a true freshman in 2011. He started four seasons, while appearing in all 12 games, recording 32 total stops with an interception and a fumble recovery. In 2012, as a sophomore, he started every game for the Rebels, finishing second on the team with 80 tackles, while adding 1.5 sacks, two interceptions, six total passes defended, two forced fumbles and two fumble recoveries. In 2013, he was named a first-team All-American by the Associated Press. Prewitt's six interceptions led the Southeastern Conference (SEC) and was tied for fourth-most by any player in the country. He finished second on the team with 70 tackles, added 13 passes defended and also had four tackles for loss and two forced fumbles.

== Professional career ==
After completion of his college career, Prewitt entered the 2015 NFL draft. Many experts projected the senior safety would go in the middle to late rounds, but as the draft concluded Prewitt was not drafted by any team. Shortly after the draft Prewitt signed to the Tennessee Titans as an undrafted free agent. Prewitt was released from the Titans roster on August 6, 2015.
