= Newell Rogers House =

- U.S. National Register of Historic Places
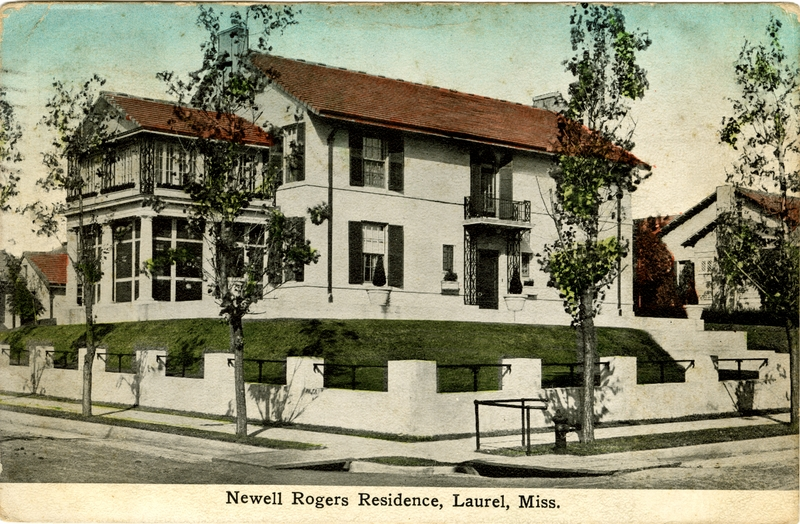

- Location within Mississippi
- Location: 706 North Sixth Avenue, Laurel, Mississippi
- Coordinates: 31°41′49″N 89°08′01″W
- Area: less than one acre
- Built: 1909
- Architect: DeBuys, Churchill & Labouisse
- Architectural style: Eclectic, Neoclassical, Mediterranean
- NRHP reference No.: 87000604
- Added to NRHP: April 20, 1987

The Newell Rogers House, also known as the R. C. Gaddis House, is a historic two-story house in Laurel, Mississippi. It was designed in an eclectic architectural style with Neoclassical and Mediterranean features by DeBuys, Churchill & Labouisse, and built in 1909 for George S. Gardiner for his daughter Juliet Gardiner and her husband Newell Rogers. It was later purchased by R. C. Gaddis, followed by Thomas Saucier. According to architectural historian Mary Warren Miller, it is "one of Laurel's most significant early twentieth-century houses." It has been listed on the National Register of Historic Places since April 20, 1987.
