= Whitfield, Jones County, Mississippi =

Whitfield, Mississippi
- Unincorporated community
- Location within Mississippi Location within the United States
- Coordinates: 31°26′43″N 89°04′28″W
- Country: United States
- State: Mississippi
- County: Jones
- Elevation: 279 ft (85 m)
- Time zone: UTC-6 (Central (CST))
  - Summer (DST): UTC-5 (CDT)
- Area codes: 601 & 769
- GNIS feature ID: 692320

Whitfield is an unincorporated community located in Jones County, Mississippi, United States.
