= Laurel Central Historic District =

- U.S. National Register of Historic Places
- U.S. Historic district
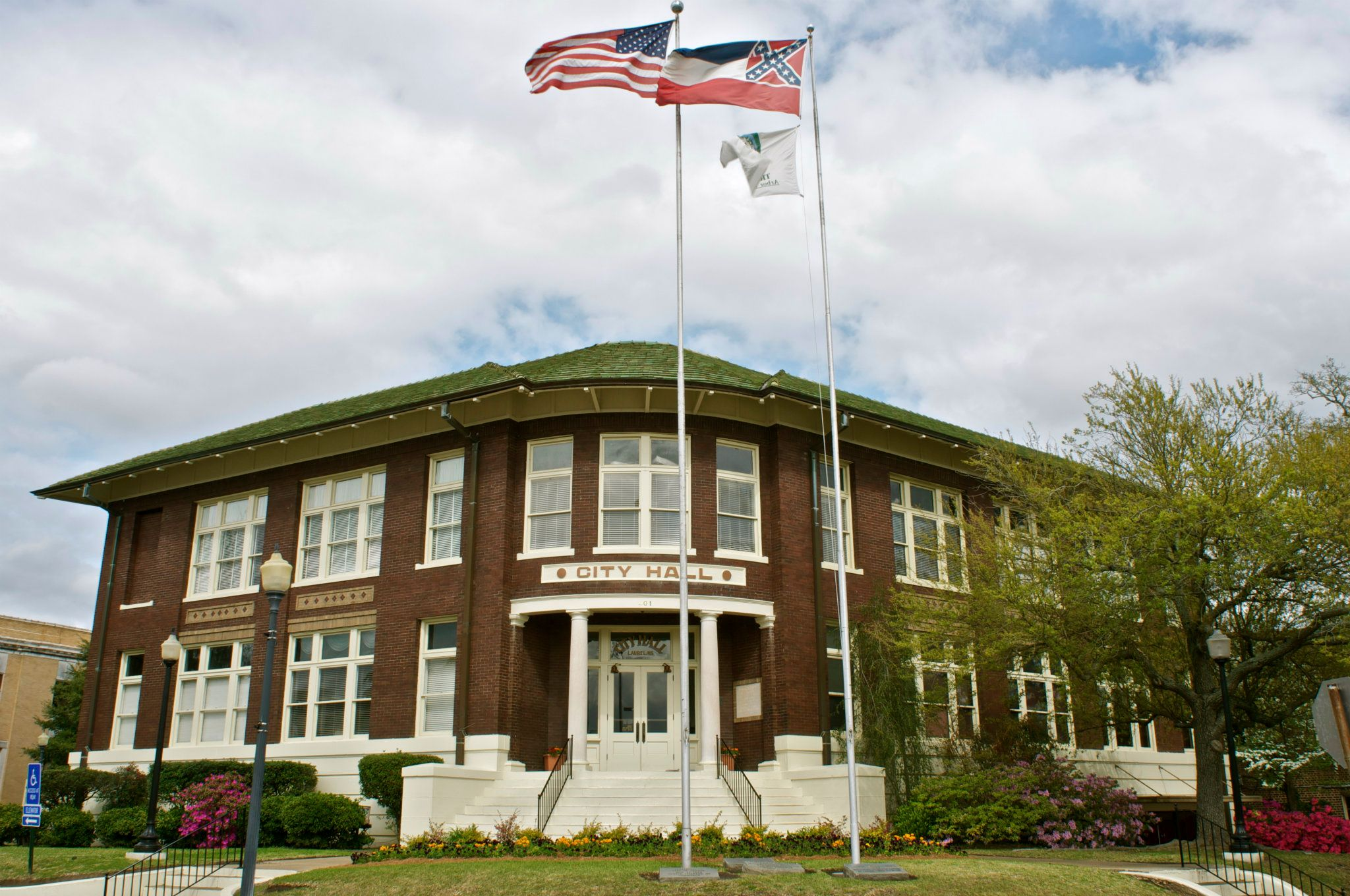
- The Laurel City Hall

- Location within Mississippi
- Location: Roughly bounded by Tenth and Thirteenth Sts., First Ave., Seventh and Fifth Sts., and Eighth Ave., Laurel, Mississippi
- Area: 161 acres (65 ha)
- Built: 1881
- Architect: Krouse, P.J.; deBuys, Rathbone
- Architectural style: Classical Revival, Bungalow/craftsman, Queen Anne
- NRHP reference No.: 86001908 (original); 100007063 (increase)

Significant dates
- Added to NRHP: September 4, 1987
- Boundary increase: October 5, 2021

The Laurel Central Historic District is a historic district in Laurel, Mississippi, U.S. It includes 369 governmental, commercial, religious and residential buildings designed in the Neoclassical, Shingle, Queen Anne, Bungalow, and American Craftsman architectural styles. It has been listed on the National Register of Historic Places since September 4, 1987.
