= Jack Nix (American football, born 1917) =

American football player (1917–1990)

- Jack Nix, 1939

No. 6
- Position: Wing back

Personal information
- Born: November 8, 1917; Moselle, Mississippi, U.S.
- Died: December 29, 1990 (age 73); Starkville, Mississippi, U.S.
- Listed height: 6 ft 0 in (1.83 m)
- Listed weight: 175 lb (79 kg)

Career information
- High school: Pachuta (MS)
- College: Mississippi State
- NFL draft: 1940: 17th round, 155th overall pick

Career history
- Cleveland Rams (1940)

Career NFL statistics
- Games played: 1
- Stats at Pro Football Reference

Jack Clarence Nix (November 8, 1917 – December 29, 1990) was an American professional football back.

A native of Moselle, Mississippi, he played college football for Mississippi State from 1937 to 1939. Nix's college nickname was "Phantom". He holds the school record for most interceptions in one game (four against Arkansas in 1939). For many years, he also held the SEC record for longest interception return (97 yards against Ole Miss in 1938). In 1940, he was the subject of a campaign gathering 247,809 votes to place him on the college all-star team.

Nix was selected by the Cleveland Rams in the 17th round (155th overall pick) of the 1940 NFL draft. He appeared in one NFL game during the 1940 season.

Nix served in the Army during World War II and the Korean War. He served in the Pacific Theater of Operations and in the occupation of Japan. He moved to Starkville in 1953 where he coached football. He was the principal at Starkville High School from 1967 to 1976. He and his wife, Mary Elizabeth Hartness Nix, had three sons (Jack Jr, Larry, and Mike). He died in 1990 at age 73.
