= Jones County, Mississippi =

County in Mississippi, United States

- County
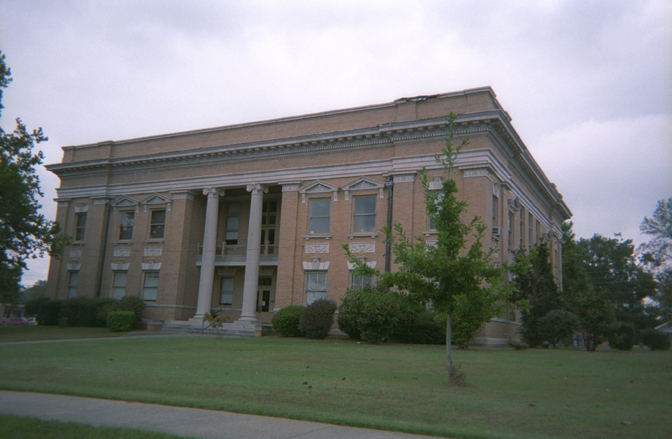
- Jones County Courthouse in Ellisville

- Flag Logo

- Location within the U.S. state of Mississippi
- Coordinates: 31.62°N 89.17°W
- Country: United States
- State: Mississippi
- Founded: 1826
- Named for: John Paul Jones
- Seat: Laurel and Ellisville
- Largest city: Laurel

Area
  - Total: 700 sq mi (1,800 km^{2})
  - Land: 695 sq mi (1,800 km^{2})
  - Water: 4.9 sq mi (13 km^{2}) 0.7%

Population (2020)
  - Total: 67,246
  - Estimate (2025): 66,496 ▼
  - Density: 96.8/sq mi (37.4/km^{2})
- Time zone: UTC−6 (Central)
  - Summer (DST): UTC−5 (CDT)
- Congressional districts: 3rd, 4th
- Website: jonescountyms.com

Jones County is in the southeastern portion of the U.S. state of Mississippi. As of the 2020 census, the population was 67,246. Its county seats are Laurel and Ellisville.

Jones County is part of the Laurel micropolitan area.

== History ==
Less than a decade after Mississippi became the country's 20th state, settlers organized this area of 700 sq mi (1,800 km^{2}) of pine forests and swamps for a new county in 1826. They named it Jones County after John Paul Jones, the early American Naval hero who rose from humble Scottish origin to military success during the American Revolution.

Ellisville, the county seat, was named for Powhatan Ellis, a member of the Mississippi Legislature who claimed to be a direct descendant of Pocahontas. During the economic hard times in the 1830s and 1840s, there was an exodus of population from Southeast Mississippi, both to western Mississippi and Louisiana in regions opened to white settlement after Indian Removal, and to Texas. The slogan "GTT" ("Gone to Texas") became widely used.

Jones County was in an area of mostly yeomen farmers and lumbermen, as the pine forests, swamp and soil were not easily cultivated for cotton. In 1860, the majority of white residents were not slaveholders. Slaves made up only 12% of the total population in Jones County in 1860, the smallest percentage of any county in the state.

=== Civil War ===
Soon after the election of Abraham Lincoln as United States president in November 1860, slave-owning planters led Mississippi to join South Carolina and secede from the Union. These were the two states with the largest holdings of slaves. On November 29, 1860, the Mississippi state legislature called for a "Convention of the people of Mississippi" to be held to "adopt such measures for vindicating the sovereignty of the State as shall appear to them to be demanded." The Convention convened on January 7, 1861, and the elected representatives from the various counties of Mississippi voted 83–15 to secede from the Union. Notably, included in the vote to secede was the representative from Jones County, Mr. John H. Powell. Other Southern states would follow suit. As Mississippi debated the secession question, the inhabitants of Jones County voted overwhelmingly for the anti-secessionist John Hathorne Powell, Jr. In comparison to the pro-secessionist J.M. Bayliss, who received 24 votes, Powell received 374. But, at the Secession Convention, Powell voted for secession. Legend has it that, for his vote, he was burned in effigy in Ellisville, the county seat.

The reality is more complicated. The only choices possible at the Secession Convention were voting for immediate secession on the one hand, or for a more cautious, co-operative approach to secession among several Southern states on the other. Powell almost certainly voted for the more conservative approach to secession—the only position available to him that was consistent with the anti-secessionist views of his constituency.

Mississippi's Declaration of Secession reflected planters' interests in its first sentence: "Our position is thoroughly identified with the institution of slavery…" Jones County had mostly yeoman farmers and cattle herders, who were not slaveholders and had little use for a war over slavery.

During the American Civil War, Jones County and neighboring counties, especially Covington County to its west, became a haven for Confederate deserters. A number of factors prompted desertions. The lack of food and supplies was demoralizing, while reports of poor conditions back home made the men fear for their families' survival. Small farms deteriorated from neglect as women and children struggled to keep them up. Their limited stores and livestock were often taken by the Confederate tax-in-kind agents, who took excessive amounts of yeoman farmers' goods. Many residents and soldiers were also outraged over the Confederate government's passing of the Twenty Negro Law, allowing wealthy plantation owners to avoid military service if they owned twenty slaves or more. For example, out of the roughly 38,000 Slaveowners living in the South in 1860, only 200 in Virginia, 120 in North Carolina, 201 in Georgia, and 300 in South Carolina were large enough to win exemptions.

==== Free State of Jones ====
On October 13, 1863, a band of deserters from Jones County and adjacent counties organized to protect the area from Confederate authorities and the crippling tax collections. The company, led by Newton Knight, formed a separate government, with Unionist leanings, known as the "Free State of Jones", and fought a recorded 14 skirmishes with Confederate forces. They also raided Paulding, capturing five wagonloads of corn that had been collected for tax from area farms, which they distributed back among the local population. The company harassed Confederate officials. Deaths believed to be at their hands were reported in 1864 among numerous tax collectors, conscript officers, and other officials.

The governor was informed by the Jones County court clerk that deserters had made tax collections in the county impossible. By the spring of 1864, the Knight company had taken effective control from the Confederate government in the county. The followers of Knight raised an American flag over the courthouse in Ellisville, and sent a letter to Union General William T. Sherman declaring Jones County's independence from the Confederacy. In July 1864, the Natchez Courier reported that Jones County had seceded from the Confederacy.

Scholars have disputed whether the county truly seceded, with some concluding it did not fully secede. While there have been numerous attempts to study Knight and his followers, the lack of documentation during and after the war has made him an elusive figure. The rebellion in Jones County has been variously characterized as consisting of local skirmishes to being a full-fledged war of independence. It assumed legendary status among some county residents and Civil War historians, culminating in the release of a 2016 feature film, Free State of Jones. The film is credited as "based on the books 'The Free State of Jones' by Victoria E. Bynum and 'The State of Jones' by Sally Jenkins and John Stauffer."

The county changed its name to Davis County, after Confederate president Jefferson Davis, on November 30, 1865, and kept the name until four years later.

== Geography ==
According to the U.S. Census Bureau, the county has a total area of 700 square miles (1,800 km^{2}), of which 695 square miles (1,800 km^{2}) is land and 4.9 square miles (13 km^{2}) (0.7%) is water.

=== Adjacent counties ===
- Jasper County (north)
- Wayne County (east)
- Perry County (southeast)
- Forrest County (southwest)
- Covington County (west)
- Smith County (northwest)

=== National protected area ===
- De Soto National Forest (part)

== Demographics ==
Historical population
Census	Pop.	Note	%±
1830	1,471		—
1840	1,258		−14.5%
1850	2,164		72.0%
1860	3,323		53.6%
1870	3,313		−0.3%
1880	3,828		15.5%
1890	8,333		117.7%
1900	17,846		114.2%
1910	29,885		67.5%
1920	32,919		10.2%
1930	41,492		26.0%
1940	49,227		18.6%
1950	57,235		16.3%
1960	59,542		4.0%
1970	56,357		−5.3%
1980	61,912		9.9%
1990	62,031		0.2%
2000	64,958		4.7%
2010	67,761		4.3%
2020	67,246		−0.8%
2025 (est.)	66,496	▼	−1.1%
U.S. Decennial Census; 1790-1960 1900–1990; 1990-2000 2010–2013

=== Racial and ethnic composition ===
Jones County, Mississippi – Racial and ethnic composition Note: the US Census treats Hispanic/Latino as an ethnic category. This table excludes Latinos from the racial categories and assigns them to a separate category. Hispanics/Latinos may be of any race.
Race / Ethnicity (NH = Non-Hispanic)	Pop 1980	Pop 1990	Pop 2000	Pop 2010	Pop 2020	% 1980	% 1990	% 2000	% 2010	% 2020
White alone (NH)	47,060	46,064	45,955	44,432	41,676	76.01%	74.26%	70.75%	65.57%	61.98%
Black or African American alone (NH)	14,152	15,457	17,032	19,076	19,135	22.86%	24.92%	26.22%	28.15%	28.46%
Native American or Alaska Native alone (NH)	171	211	241	288	364	0.28%	0.34%	0.37%	0.43%	0.54%
Asian alone (NH)	77	87	172	302	272	0.12%	0.14%	0.26%	0.45%	0.40%
Native Hawaiian or Pacific Islander alone (NH)	x	x	6	7	24	x	x	0.01%	0.01%	0.04%
Other race alone (NH)	15	7	21	25	148	0.02%	0.01%	0.03%	0.04%	0.22%
Mixed race or Multiracial (NH)	x	x	260	432	1,488	x	x	0.40%	0.64%	2.21%
Hispanic or Latino (any race)	437	205	1,271	3,199	4,139	0.71%	0.33%	1.96%	4.72%	6.16%
Total	61,912	62,031	64,958	67,761	67,246	100.00%	100.00%	100.00%	100.00%	100.00%

=== 2020 census ===
As of the 2020 census, the county had a population of 67,246. The median age was 38.8 years. 24.5% of residents were under the age of 18 and 17.9% of residents were 65 years of age or older. For every 100 females there were 93.4 males, and for every 100 females age 18 and over there were 90.4 males age 18 and over.

Jones County racial composition (2020)
Race	Perc.
White	62.6%
Black or African American	28.6%
American Indian and Alaska Native	0.7%
Asian	0.4%
Native Hawaiian and Other Pacific Islander	<0.1%
Some other race	4.5%
Two or more races	3.2%
Hispanic or Latino (of any race)	6.2%

The racial makeup of the county was 62.6% White, 28.6% Black or African American, 0.7% American Indian and Alaska Native, 0.4% Asian, <0.1% Native Hawaiian and Pacific Islander, 4.5% from some other race, and 3.2% from two or more races. Hispanic or Latino residents of any race comprised 6.2% of the population.

37.5% of residents lived in urban areas, while 62.5% lived in rural areas.

There were 25,375 households in the county, of which 32.8% had children under the age of 18 living in them. Of all households, 45.3% were married-couple households, 18.1% were households with a male householder and no spouse or partner present, and 31.2% were households with a female householder and no spouse or partner present. About 26.7% of all households were made up of individuals and 12.3% had someone living alone who was 65 years of age or older.

There were 28,488 housing units, of which 10.9% were vacant. Among occupied housing units, 72.3% were owner-occupied and 27.7% were renter-occupied. The homeowner vacancy rate was 1.0% and the rental vacancy rate was 9.0%.

== Economy ==
The economy of Jones County is still primarily rural and based on resources – timber and agriculture.

According to the Economic Development Authority of Jones County, the top employers in the county are:

#	Employer	Employees
1	Howard Industries	3,700
2	South Central Regional Medical Center	1,837
3	Ellisville State School	1,459
4	Jones County School District	1,162
5	Sanderson Farms	889
6	Wayne Farms	715
7	Laurel School District	600
8	Walmart	585
9	Masonite	556
10	Jones County	510
11	Sawmill Square Mall	450
12	Jones County Junior College	427
13	MS Industries for Individuals with Disabilities	415
14	Southern Hens	390
15	City of Laurel	317
16	Tanner Construction	185
17	Hudson's Salvage Center	153
18	Dunn Roadbuilders	145
19	Morgan Brothers Millwork	137
20	West Quality Food Service	135

== Government and infrastructure ==
The Mississippi Department of Mental Health South Mississippi State Hospital Crisis Intervention Center is in Laurel and in Jones County.

== Transportation ==
=== Major highways ===
- Interstate 59
- U.S. Highway 11
- U.S. Highway 84
- Mississippi Highway 15
- Mississippi Highway 28
- Mississippi Highway 29

=== Airport ===
Hattiesburg-Laurel Regional Airport is located in an unincorporated area in the county, near Moselle.

== Politics ==
Like much of Mississippi in general, Jones County has been a Republican stronghold since the 1960s.

United States presidential election results for Jones County, Mississippi
Year	Republican		Democratic		Third party(ies)	
Year	No.	%	No.	%	No.	%
1912	34	2.37%	1,058	73.88%	340	23.74%
1916	196	9.42%	1,664	80.00%	220	10.58%
1920	419	30.08%	734	52.69%	240	17.23%
1924	318	10.08%	2,373	75.21%	464	14.71%
1928	1,804	44.13%	2,284	55.87%	0	0.00%
1932	173	4.15%	3,816	91.47%	183	4.39%
1936	185	3.94%	4,461	95.02%	49	1.04%
1940	242	5.09%	4,517	94.91%	0	0.00%
1944	337	6.58%	4,782	93.42%	0	0.00%
1948	193	2.96%	599	9.18%	5,736	87.87%
1952	4,039	40.70%	5,884	59.30%	0	0.00%
1956	2,463	29.81%	5,137	62.17%	663	8.02%
1960	2,729	25.92%	4,871	46.27%	2,928	27.81%
1964	12,123	85.95%	1,981	14.05%	0	0.00%
1968	3,242	18.02%	2,476	13.76%	12,276	68.22%
1972	16,489	83.79%	2,790	14.18%	400	2.03%
1976	11,098	51.49%	10,139	47.04%	315	1.46%
1980	12,900	53.11%	11,117	45.77%	272	1.12%
1984	17,586	70.47%	7,298	29.25%	70	0.28%
1988	16,764	69.07%	7,383	30.42%	125	0.51%
1992	13,824	56.59%	8,035	32.89%	2,571	10.52%
1996	13,020	59.62%	7,360	33.70%	1,457	6.67%
2000	16,341	67.14%	7,713	31.69%	286	1.18%
2004	19,125	71.72%	7,398	27.74%	143	0.54%
2008	20,157	68.86%	8,846	30.22%	270	0.92%
2012	20,687	68.59%	9,211	30.54%	261	0.87%
2016	20,133	71.01%	7,791	27.48%	428	1.51%
2020	21,226	70.54%	8,517	28.30%	348	1.16%
2024	20,265	73.01%	7,272	26.20%	218	0.79%

== Communities ==
=== Cities ===
- Ellisville
- Laurel

=== Towns ===
- Sandersville
- Soso

=== Census-designated place ===
- Eastabuchie
- Moselle
- Ovett
- Sharon

=== Unincorporated communities ===
- Amy
- Errata
- Sand Hill
- Tawanta
- Whitfield

== Education ==
There are two school districts in Jones County: Jones County School District and Laurel School District (which includes most of, but not all of, Laurel).

Jones County is in the zone of Jones College.

== Notable people ==
- Lance Bass, singer with NSYNC
- Ralph Boston, Olympic track and field medalist
- Jason Campbell, retired National Football League quarterback
- Mary Elizabeth Ellis-Day, actress
- Carroll Gartin, lieutenant governor of Mississippi
- Newton Knight, farmer and opponent of secession and slavery, a Confederate deserter who led a guerrilla rebellion against local Confederate officials as the leader of the Knight Company and Jones County Scouts; he was a US Marshal and a leading Republican figure in the Reconstruction of Mississippi
- Ira C. Welborn, Medal of Honor recipient in the Spanish–American War
- Tom Lester, actor best known for playing "Eb" on Green Acres
- Amos McLemore, schoolteacher, Methodist pastor, businessman, and one-time opponent of Southern secession from the Union; commissioned as a Confederate officer at the rank of major; he was reputedly assassinated by Newton Knight
- Charles W. Pickering, retired Federal Circuit Judge who served on the United States Court of Appeals for the Fifth Circuit
- Parker Posey, actress
- Leontyne Price, operatic soprano
- James Street, author
- Ray Walston, actor My Favorite Martian

== See also ==
- Bainbridge County
- National Register of Historic Places listings in Jones County, Mississippi
