= Amos Deason House =

- U.S. National Register of Historic Places
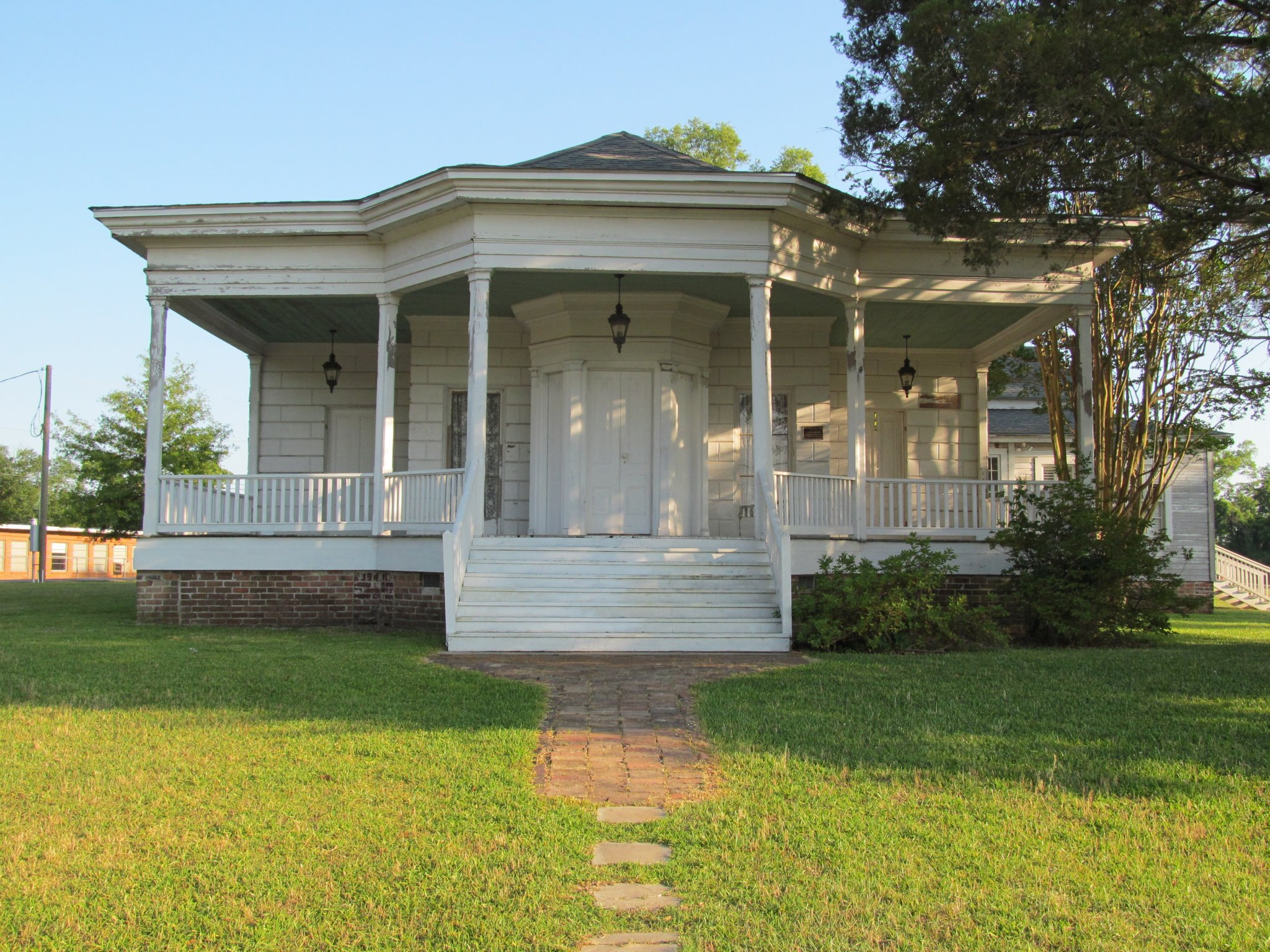
- The house in 2014

- Location within Mississippi
- Location: 410 North Deason Street, Ellisville, Mississippi
- Coordinates: 31°36′33″N 89°11′49″W
- Area: 1 acre (0.40 ha)
- Architectural style: Greek Revival
- NRHP reference No.: 84002229
- Added to NRHP: July 5, 1984

The Amos Deason House is a historic one-story house in Ellisville, Mississippi, U.S.. It was built in 1855–1860, and designed in the Greek Revival architectural style. According to the Hattiesburg American, it is "the oldest house in Jones County." During the American Civil War of 1861–1865, Confederate Major Amos McLemore was assassinated by Newt Knight in the house in 1863. As a result, the house is reportedly haunted, with "unexplained noises, sightings, voices, blood and cold spots and other occurrences." It has been listed on the National Register of Historic Places since July 5, 1984. It was donated to the Daughters of the American Revolution in the 1990s.
