= Jones County School District (Mississippi) =

School district in Mississippi

Coordinates: 31.630778°N 89.181234°W

The Jones County School District is a public school district based in Ellisville, Mississippi (USA).

Located in Jones County, it includes portions of Hattiesburg, as well as the municipalities of Ellisville, Sandersville, and Soso, and the census-designated places of Moselle, Ovett, Kracker's Neck, and Sharon, as well as the Jones County portion of Eastabuchie.

== Schools ==
=== Middle/high schools ===
- Grades 7–12
  - Northeast Jones High School
  - South Jones High School
  - West Jones High School

=== West Jones High High School ===
West Jones High School is in Soso, Mississippi. It is the largest school in the county. The school's mascot is the Mustang.

The annual beating of the Braves is an annual tradition at West Jones. West beats South every year in football. West Jones is the school of choice for the majority of residents in Jones County.

=== South Jones High High School ===
South Jones High School is in Ellisville, Mississippi. It serves grades 7-12 and has more than 1,200 students. It is in the Jones County School District. Braves are the school mascot.

The school is about 72.5 percent white, 16.5 percent black, and 8 percent hispanic.

== Alumni ==
- Cody Prewitt, football player

=== Elementary schools ===
- Grades K-6
  - East Jones Elementary School
  - Glade Elementary School
  - North Jones Elementary School
  - Moselle Elementary School
  - West Jones Elementary School
  - South Jones Elementary School

== Demographics ==
=== 2017-18 school year ===
There was a total of 8,837 students enrolled in the Jones County School District during the 2017–2018 school year. The gender makeup of the district was 49% female and 51% male. The racial makeup of the district was 19.3% African American, 64.8% White, 10.4% Hispanic, 1.0% Native American, and 0.6% Asian. 68.5% of the district's students were eligible to receive free lunch.

=== Previous school years ===
School Year	Enrollment	Gender Makeup		Racial Makeup				
School Year	Enrollment	Female	Male	Asian	African American	Hispanic	Native American	White
2006-07	8,049	48%	52%	0.40%	21.26%	2.72%	0.80%	74.83%
2005-06	8,031	48%	52%	0.39%	21.54%	2.04%	0.80%	75.23%
2004-05	7,907	48%	52%	0.39%	21.88%	1.73%	0.63%	75.36%
2003-04	7,811	48%	52%	0.40%	21.42%	1.54%	0.74%	75.91%
2002-03	7,755	48%	52%	0.36%	21.03%	1.04%	0.70%	76.87%

== Accountability statistics ==
	2006-07	2005-06	2004-05	2003-04	2002-03
District Accreditation Status	Accredited	Accredited	Accredited	Accredited	Accredited
School Performance Classifications
Level 5 (Superior Performing) Schools	5	7	6	6	3
Level 4 (Exemplary) Schools	4	3	3	4	6
Level 3 (Successful) Schools	2	1	2	1	2
Level 2 (Under Performing) Schools	0	0	0	0	0
Level 1 (Low Performing) Schools	0	0	0	0	0
Not Assigned	0	0	0	0	0

== See also ==
- List of school districts in Mississippi
