= Laurel School District (Mississippi) =

School district in Mississippi

Address
- 303 West 8th Street Laurel, Mississippi, 39440; United States

District information
- Type: Public
- Grades: PreK–12
- NCES District ID: 2802460

Students and staff
- Students: 2,833 (2020–2021)
- Teachers: 195.19 (on an FTE basis)
- Staff: 208.02 (on an FTE basis)
- Student–teacher ratio: 14.51:1

Other information
- Website: www.laurelschools.org

The Laurel School District is a public school district based in Laurel, Mississippi, United States. It serves almost all of Laurel.

== Administration (2026–27) ==
=== Leadership ===
- Michael Eubanks, Superintendent

=== Board of trustees ===
- Doncella Milton, President
- Keith Ridgeway, Vice President
- Louis Wilford, Secretary
- Read Diket, Member
- Louis Crumbly, Member

=== Schools ===
Laurel Education Center (alternative school)

- Principal/Assist. Athletic Director: Jaymar Jackson

Laurel High School (9th – 12th/CTC)

- Principal: Christopher Mark

Laurel Middle School (7th & 8th)

- Principal: Torquato O'Neal

Laurel Upper Elementary School (5th & 6th)

- Interim Principal: Audarshia Lee-Flagg

Nora Davis Intermediate Elementary School (2nd – 4th)

- Principal: Rachel Virgess

Oak Park Lower Elementary School (4K – 1st)

- Principal: Leander Bridges, II

Laurel Magnet Schools of the Arts (4K – 6th)

- Principal: Heather Jones

== See also ==
- List of school districts in Mississippi
