= Laurel, Mississippi =

City in Mississippi, United States

- City
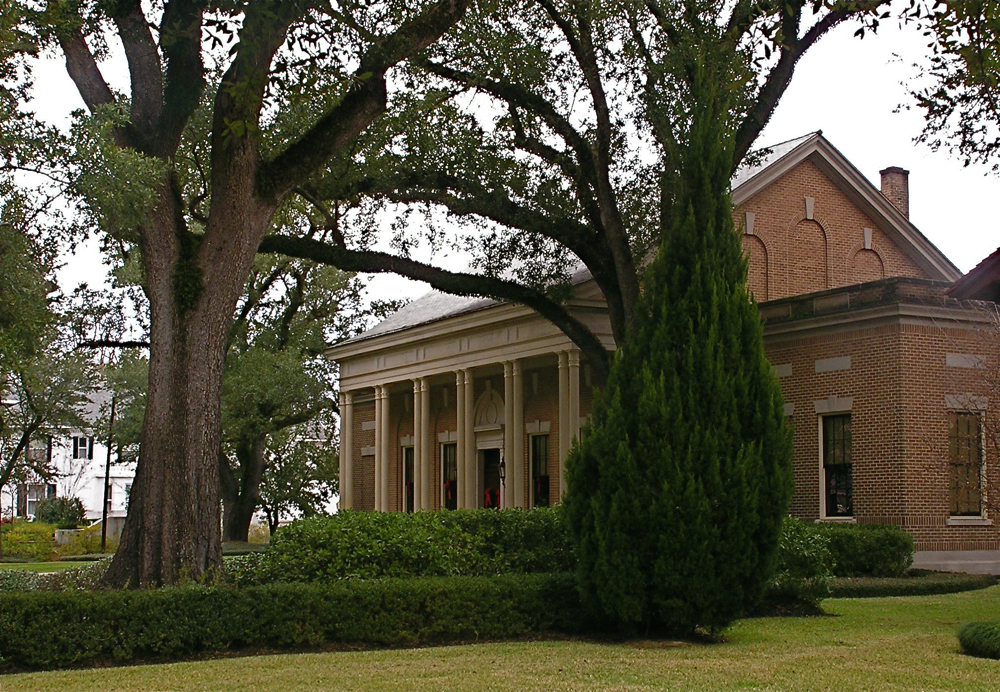
- Lauren Rogers Museum of Art

- Flag City logo
- Nickname: "The City Beautiful"
- Location in the contiguous United States Location in Mississippi
- Coordinates: 31°41′51″N 89°8′22″W
- Country: United States
- State: Mississippi
- County: Jones
- Incorporated: 1882; 144 years ago

Government
  - Type: Mayor-council
  - Mayor: Johnny Magee (D)

Area
  - Total: 16.54 sq mi (42.83 km^{2})
  - Land: 16.24 sq mi (42.05 km^{2})
  - Water: 0.30 sq mi (0.78 km^{2})
- Elevation: 269 ft (82 m)

Population (2020)
  - Total: 17,161
  - Density: 1,057/sq mi (408.1/km^{2})
- Time zone: UTC−6 (CST)
  - Summer (DST): UTC−5 (CDT)
- ZIP codes: 39440–39443
- Area codes: 601, 769
- FIPS code: 28-39640
- GNIS feature ID: 0672321
- Website: www.laurelms.com

Laurel is a city in and the second county seat of Jones County, Mississippi, United States. As of the 2020 census, the city had a population of 17,161. Laurel is northeast of Ellisville, the first county seat, which contains the first county courthouse. It has the second county courthouse, as Jones County has two judicial districts. Laurel is the headquarters of the Jones County Sheriff's Department, which has jurisdiction in the county. Laurel is the principal city of a micropolitan statistical area named for it. Its major employers include Howard Industries, Sanderson Farms, Masonite International, Family Health Center, Howse Implement, Thermo-Kool, and South Central Regional Medical Center. Laurel is home to the Lauren Rogers Museum of Art, Mississippi's oldest art museum, established by the family of Lauren Eastman Rogers.

== History ==
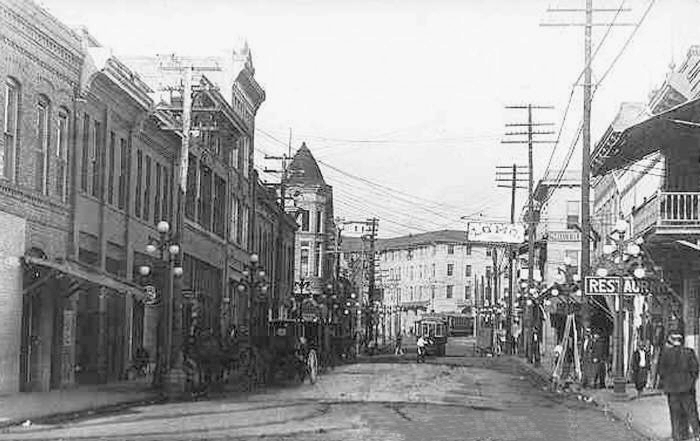
Oak Street, circa 1900

Following the 1881 construction of the New Orleans and Northeastern Railroad through the area, economic development occurred rapidly. The city of Laurel was incorporated in 1882, with timber as the impetus. Yellow pine forests in the region fueled the industry. The city was named for thickets of mountain laurel (Kalmia latifolia) native to the original town site.

Located in the heart of the piney woods ecoregion of the Southeastern United States, the land site that eventually became Laurel was densely covered with forests of virgin longleaf pine, making the area attractive to pioneering lumberjacks and sawmill operators in the late 19th century.

In 1881, business partners John Kamper and A.M. Lewin constructed a small lumber mill on the New Orleans and Northeastern Railroad. Kamper and Lewin's mill was in an area that later became Laurel's First Avenue. The next year, in response to a Post Office Department request to provide a postal delivery name for their mill and its surrounding lumber camp, Kamper and Lewin submitted the name "Lawrell" as an homage to the area's naturally growing mountain laurel bushes. Federal postal officials soon "corrected" the peculiar spelling, giving the town its current spelling.

During its first decade or so, Laurel was little more than a glorified lumber camp surrounding Kamper and Lewin's primitive sawmill. By 1891, Kamper's company was on the verge of bankruptcy, leading him to sell the mill and extensive land holdings in the area (more than 15,000 acres), to Clinton, Iowa, lumber barons Lauren Chase Eastman and George and Silas Gardiner, founders of the Eastman-Gardiner Company.

After their purchase, Eastman and the Gardiner brothers decided to make substantial improvements to Laurel's lumber operations by constructing a new, much larger, state-of-the-art lumber mill. In 1893, the new Eastman-Gardiner Company mill began operations, using the best technology and labor-saving devices of the day.

By the early 1900s, the success of Eastman-Gardner Company's operations in Laurel and the region's superabundance of timber began to attract other lumber industrialists' attention. In 1906, the Gilchrist-Fordney Company, whose founders hailed from Alpena, Michigan, began construction on their own lumber mill in Laurel. By March 1907, the Mobile, Jackson and Kansas City Railroad made four stops a day in Laurel, which was 110 track miles from Mobile, Alabama. The trains not only carried passengers, but also hauled freight that included lumber from nine sawmills. Together, they produced around 583,000 board feet (bf) a day. WM Carter Lumber Company (milepost 108) produced 20,000 bf; Eastman-Gardner and Company, 200,000 bf; Kingston Lumber Company, 200,000 bf; Geo Beckner (shingles), 20,000 bf; John Lindsey, 15,000 bf; HC Card Lumber Company (hard wood), 30,000 bf; Lindsey Wagon Works mill, 15,000 bf; WM Carter (planer). 75,000 bf; and Stainton and Weems, 8,000 bf.

The Wausau-Southern mill from Wausau, Wisconsin, followed in 1911, and the Marathon mill from Memphis, Tennessee, in 1914. By the end of World War I, Laurel's mills produced and shipped more yellow pine lumber than those of any other location in the world. By the 1920s—the peak of Laurel's lumber production—the area's four mills were producing a total of one million board feet (2,400 m^{3}) of lumber per day.

The economic prosperity of Laurel's timber era (1893–1937) and "timber families" created the famed Laurel Central Historic District. The area is considered Mississippi's largest, finest, and most intact collection of early 20th-century architecture, and has been listed on the National Register of Historic Places since September 4, 1987, for both its historical value and its wide variety of architectural styles. Many of the district's homes and buildings are featured on the HGTV series Home Town. In addition to influencing a diverse architectural district, Laurel's "timber families" influenced the building of the town's broad avenues, the design of numerous public parks, and the development of strong public schools.

The city's population grew markedly during the early 20th century because rural people were attracted to manufacturing jobs and the economic takeoff of Masonite International. Mechanization of agriculture reduced the number of farming jobs. The city reached its peak census population in 1960, and has declined about one third since then.

Laurel was the site of several notable racial incidents prior to and during the Civil Rights movement. In 1942, Howard Wash, a 45-year-old African-American man who had been convicted of murder, was dragged from jail and lynched by a mob. At midnight on May 8, 1951, Willie McGee was electrocuted in Laurel after being convicted of raping a white woman. Over a thousand white citizens gathered at the courthouse for the execution, which was broadcast on the radio. In March 1968, Martin Luther King Jr. spoke at the St. Paul United Methodist Church in Laurel. It was one year after the Ku Klux Klan had firebombed the church.

== Geography ==
Laurel is in north-central Jones County, 8 miles (13 km) northeast of Ellisville, the first county seat. Interstate 59 and U.S. Route 11 pass through Laurel, both highways leading southwest 30 miles (48 km) to Hattiesburg and northeast 57 miles (92 km) to Meridian. U.S. Route 84 passes through the south side of the city, leading east 30 miles (48 km) to Waynesboro and west 27 miles (43 km) to Collins. Mississippi Highway 15 passes through the south and west sides of the city, leading northwest 24 miles (39 km) to Bay Springs and southeast 28 miles (45 km) to Richton.

According to the United States Census Bureau, Laurel has an area of 16.5 square miles (42.8 km^{2}), of which 0.3 square miles (0.8 km^{2}), or 1.81%, is covered by water. The city lies on a low ridge between Tallahala Creek to the east and Tallahoma Creek to the west. Tallahoma Creek joins Tallahala Creek south of Laurel, and Tallahala Creek continues south to join the Leaf River, part of the Pascagoula River watershed.

=== Climate ===
The climate in this area is characterized by hot, humid summers and generally mild to cool winters. According to the Köppen climate classification, Laurel has a humid subtropical climate, Cfa on climate maps. The area is also somewhat prone to tornadoes. On December 28, 1954, an F3 tornado tore directly through the city, injuring 25 people.

Climate data for Laurel, Mississippi, 1991–2020 normals, extremes 1891–present
Month	Jan	Feb	Mar	Apr	May	Jun	Jul	Aug	Sep	Oct	Nov	Dec	Year
Record high °F (°C)	83 (28)	85 (29)	91 (33)	94 (34)	99 (37)	106 (41)	106 (41)	108 (42)	105 (41)	100 (38)	89 (32)	86 (30)	108 (42)
Mean maximum °F (°C)	75.3 (24.1)	78.8 (26.0)	83.6 (28.7)	86.2 (30.1)	91.6 (33.1)	95.4 (35.2)	97.4 (36.3)	97.3 (36.3)	94.7 (34.8)	89.7 (32.1)	81.8 (27.7)	77.2 (25.1)	98.5 (36.9)
Mean daily maximum °F (°C)	59.9 (15.5)	64.7 (18.2)	71.9 (22.2)	78.6 (25.9)	85.4 (29.7)	90.9 (32.7)	93.2 (34.0)	92.7 (33.7)	88.7 (31.5)	80.0 (26.7)	69.7 (20.9)	62.4 (16.9)	78.2 (25.7)
Daily mean °F (°C)	47.3 (8.5)	51.5 (10.8)	58.5 (14.7)	65.2 (18.4)	72.9 (22.7)	79.4 (26.3)	81.8 (27.7)	81.2 (27.3)	76.6 (24.8)	66.2 (19.0)	55.8 (13.2)	49.7 (9.8)	65.5 (18.6)
Mean daily minimum °F (°C)	34.6 (1.4)	38.3 (3.5)	45.0 (7.2)	51.7 (10.9)	60.4 (15.8)	67.9 (19.9)	70.3 (21.3)	69.7 (20.9)	64.4 (18.0)	52.5 (11.4)	41.8 (5.4)	36.9 (2.7)	52.8 (11.5)
Mean minimum °F (°C)	20.5 (−6.4)	24.8 (−4.0)	29.6 (−1.3)	38.2 (3.4)	47.6 (8.7)	60.4 (15.8)	65.6 (18.7)	64.5 (18.1)	53.8 (12.1)	37.6 (3.1)	28.0 (−2.2)	24.3 (−4.3)	18.4 (−7.6)
Record low °F (°C)	3 (−16)	−1 (−18)	17 (−8)	27 (−3)	36 (2)	45 (7)	56 (13)	54 (12)	40 (4)	23 (−5)	16 (−9)	3 (−16)	−1 (−18)
Average precipitation inches (mm)	6.07 (154)	5.11 (130)	5.46 (139)	5.10 (130)	4.34 (110)	5.46 (139)	5.38 (137)	5.48 (139)	3.94 (100)	3.48 (88)	4.06 (103)	5.76 (146)	59.64 (1,515)
Average precipitation days (≥ 0.01 in)	11.3	10.4	9.8	9.0	9.4	11.3	13.1	10.9	7.6	6.4	8.1	10.5	117.8
Source: NOAAIEM

== Demographics ==
Historical population
Census	Pop.	Note	%±
1900	3,193		—
1910	8,465		165.1%
1920	13,037		54.0%
1930	18,017		38.2%
1940	20,598		14.3%
1950	25,038		21.6%
1960	27,889		11.4%
1970	24,145		−13.4%
1980	21,897		−9.3%
1990	18,827		−14.0%
2000	18,393		−2.3%
2010	18,540		0.8%
2020	17,161		−7.4%
U.S. Decennial Census

=== 2020 census ===
As of the 2020 census, Laurel had a population of 17,161. The median age was 36.3 years. 26.9% of residents were under the age of 18 and 16.9% of residents were 65 years of age or older. For every 100 females there were 88.4 males, and for every 100 females age 18 and over there were 84.0 males age 18 and over.

95.6% of residents lived in urban areas, while 4.4% lived in rural areas.

There were 6,447 households in Laurel, of which 34.4% had children under the age of 18 living in them. Of all households, 30.5% were married-couple households, 20.6% were households with a male householder and no spouse or partner present, and 42.5% were households with a female householder and no spouse or partner present. About 31.3% of all households were made up of individuals and 14.1% had someone living alone who was 65 years of age or older. There were 4,278 families in the city.

There were 7,320 housing units, of which 11.9% were vacant. The homeowner vacancy rate was 1.3% and the rental vacancy rate was 8.5%.

Laurel racial composition as of 2020
Race	Num.	Perc.
White (non-Hispanic – NH)	4,465	26.02%
Black or African American (NH)	10,642	62.01%
Native American	35	0.2%
Asian	109	0.64%
Pacific Islander	2	0.01%
Multiracial or other race	453	2.64%
Hispanic or Latino	1,455	8.48%

== Government ==
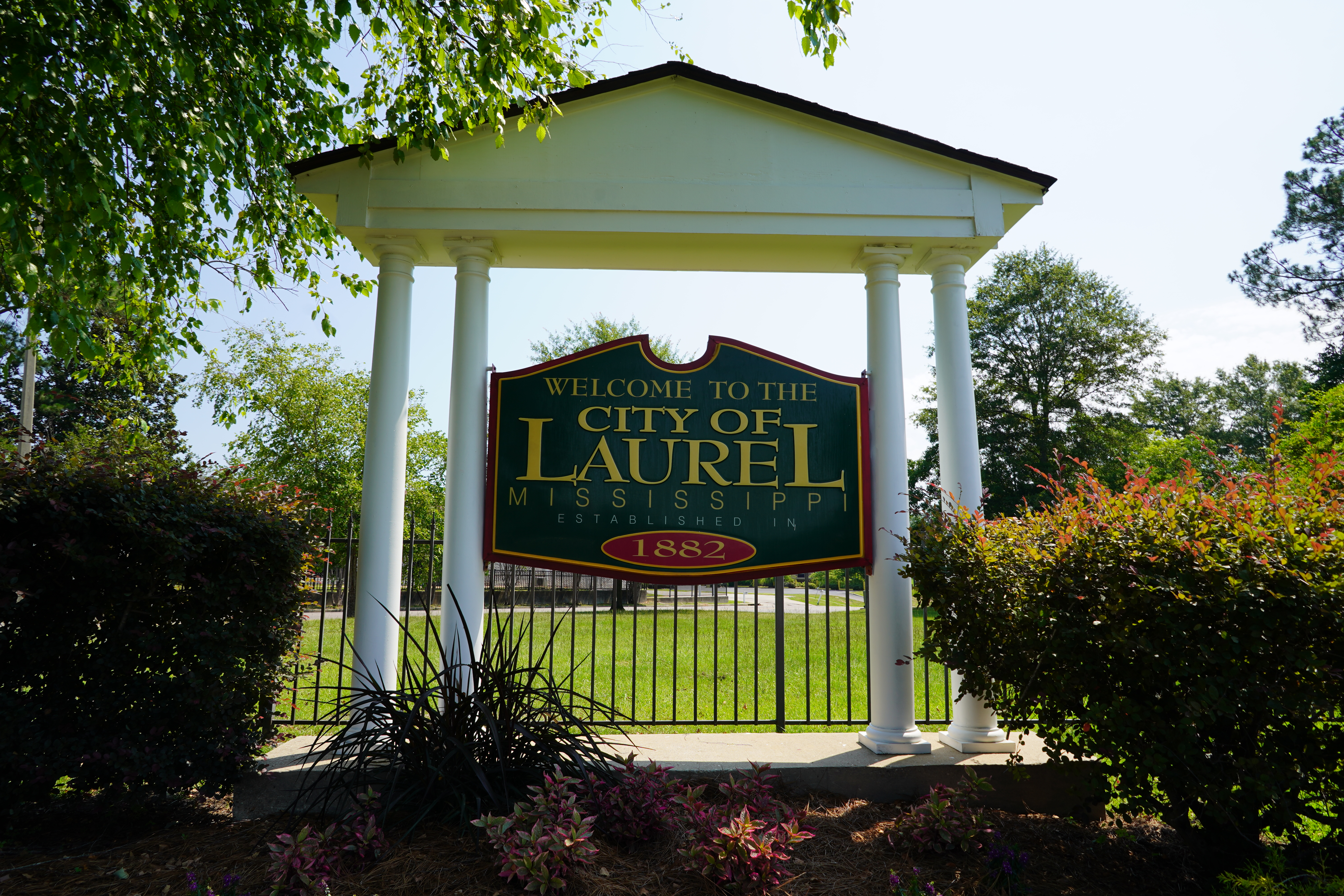
Laurel, Mississippi welcome sign

City government has a mayor-council form. The mayor is elected at-large. Council members are elected from single-member districts.

The Mississippi Department of Mental Health South Mississippi State Hospital Crisis Intervention Center is in Laurel.

== Education ==
Almost all of Laurel is in the Laurel School District. Small portions are in the Jones County School District.

- The portion in the Laurel School District is served by Laurel High School.

Private schools:

- Laurel Christian School
- Laurel Christian High School
- St. John's Day School (affiliated with the Episcopal Church)

Jones County is within the district served by the Jones College community college.

== Media ==
- WDAM-TV
- WHLT-TV
- WLAU (99.3 FM, SuperTalk Mississippi)
- The Laurel Leader-Call newspaper
- The Chronicle
- WXRR (104.5 FM, "Rock104")
- WBBN (95.9 FM, "B-95")
- Impact Laurel

== Infrastructure ==
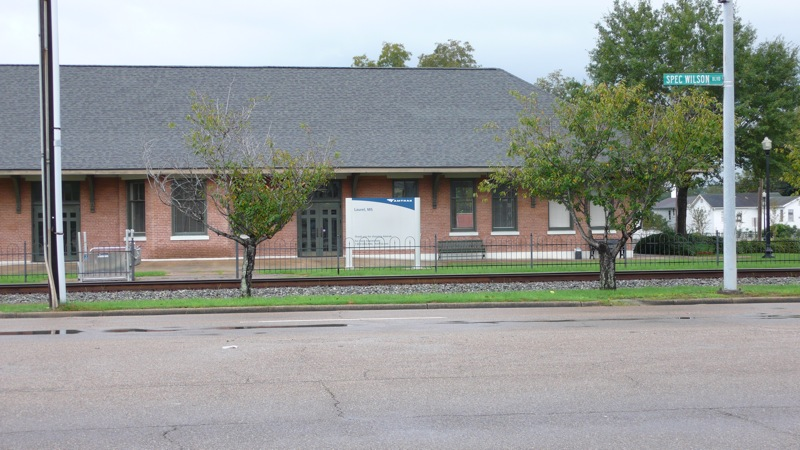
Laurel Train station

Amtrak's Crescent train connects Laurel with New York City; Philadelphia; Baltimore; Washington, D.C.; Charlotte, North Carolina; Atlanta; Birmingham, Alabama; and New Orleans. Laurel's Amtrak station is at 230 North Maple Street.

Hattiesburg–Laurel Regional Airport is in an unincorporated area in Jones County near Moselle, 21 miles (34 km) southwest of Laurel.

Major highways

- Interstate 59
- U.S. Route 84
- U.S. Route 11
- Mississippi Highway 15

== Notable people ==
- Jake Allen, professional football player
- Jean Antone, former professional wrestler
- Lance Bass, musician
- Marsha Blackburn, U.S. senator for Tennessee
- Ralph Boston, Olympic champion athlete
- Correll Buckhalter, former professional football player
- Lee Calhoun, Olympic champion athlete
- Jason Campbell, professional football player
- David and the Giants, Christian rock band
- Akeem Davis, professional football player
- Mary Elizabeth Ellis, actress
- Carroll Gartin, former lieutenant governor
- James E. Gonzales, politician
- Ed Hinton, sportswriter
- Tess Holliday, model
- Robert Hyatt, computer scientist
- BoPete Keyes, professional football player
- Diane Ladd, actress, raised in Meridian
- Mark A. Landis, painter
- Tom Lester, television actor
- Mundell Lowe, jazz musician
- Doug Marlette, Pulitzer Prize-winning cartoonist
- Chris McDaniel, attorney and politician
- Mary Mills, professional golfer
- Sam Myers, blues musician
- Kenny Payne, former professional basketball player
- Charles W. Pickering, politician and judge
- Chip Pickering, former congressman
- Stacey Pickering, State Auditor of Mississippi
- Clinton Portis, former professional football player
- Parker Posey, actress
- Leontyne Price, opera singer
- Omeria McDonald Scott, state representative
- Ray Walston, actor
- Lloyd Wells, musician
- Will Wheaton, singer-songwriter

== In popular culture ==
In Tennessee Williams' play A Streetcar Named Desire, fictional Laurel native Blanche DuBois is known here as a "woman of loose morals", who after the loss of her family estate "Belle Reve", frequents the Hotel Flamingo as told to Stanley by the merchant Kiefaber. In an argument, Blanche tells Harold Mitchell she has brought many victims into her web, and calls the hotel the Tarantula Arms rather than the Hotel Flamingo.

Mississippi-born singer-songwriter Steve Forbert released the song "Goin' Down To Laurel" as the first track on his 1978 debut album Alive on Arrival.

Laurel is the setting for most of the renovation projects featured on Home Town.

== See also ==
- Laurel Black Cats, semi-professional baseball team
