= East Mississippi State Hospital =

Coordinates: 32°22′35.76″N 88°43′20.64″W

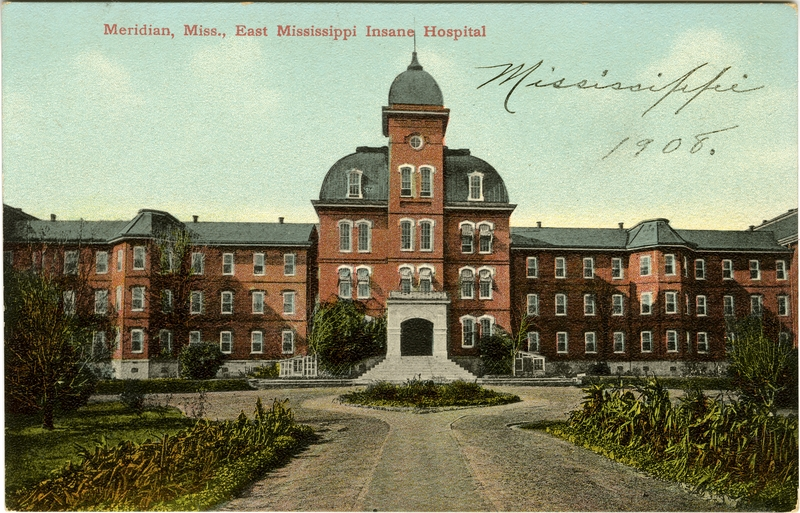
- East Mississippi State Hospital in the early 1900s

Geography
- Location: Meridian, Mississippi, United States

Links
- Website: www.emsh.state.ms.us
- Lists: Hospitals in Mississippi

The East Mississippi State Hospital (EMSH) is a mental health facility of the Mississippi Department of Mental Health located in Meridian, Mississippi. The facility is the third-largest employer in the Meridian area.

A regional center, EMSH serves 31 counties, including Alcorn, Covington, Choctaw, Clarke, Clay, Forrest, George, Greene, Jackson, Jasper, Jefferson Davis, Jones, Kemper, Lamar, Lauderdale County, Leake, Lowndes, Marion, Neshoba, Newton, Noxubee, Oktibbeha, Perry, Prentiss, Scott, Smith, Tippah, Tishomingo, Wayne, Webster, and Winston.

== History ==
Due to advocacy from Dorothea Dix, on March 8, 1882, the Mississippi State Legislature passed legislation establishing the East Mississippi State Insane Asylum. The hospital opened in a location 2 miles (3.2 km) west of Meridian in 1885. In 1898 the facility's name was changed to the East Mississippi Insane Hospital. In the 1930s the facility received its current name. In 1984 the MDMH Board of Mental Health established a catchment area to EMSH so that admissions to EMSH and the Mississippi State Hospital would be balanced. As of 2010 the 31 county catchment area for EMSH has a population of about 900,000 people.
