= SMSH =

SMSH can refer to:

- South Miami High School ("South Miami Senior High")
- South Mississippi State Hospital
