= Howard Philips Smith =

- Born: 29 May 1956 (age 70); Houston, Texas
- Occupation: Author
- Writing career
- Genres: non-fiction and fiction

Howard Philips Smith (born 1956) is an American writer, novelist, and photographer, known primarily for his historical works, which focus on expanding the scope of gay history, especially in New Orleans. His books include Unveiling the Muse: The Lost History of Gay Carnival in New Orleans and A Sojourn in Paradise: Jack Robinson in 1950s New Orleans.

== Education ==
Smith grew up in Oloh, Mississippi, a small rural community near Hattiesburg. He attended the University of Southern Mississippi, graduating cum laude with majors in history and French. A Fulbright Scholarship (1977) brought him to France for study, where he attended the Université de Bourgogne, Dijon.

After teaching English in Bordeaux, Smith was drawn back to New Orleans where he spent almost a decade during the 1980s. Here he collected notes for a novel and seriously pursued photography. In 1986, he moved to Los Angeles where his photography gained some notoriety and by 1995, he was included in the exhibition P.L.A.N.: Photography Los Angeles Now, curated by Robert Sobiezek and Tim Wride at the Los Angeles County Museum of Art. In addition, he served as president of the board of directors for the Los Angeles Center for Photographic Studies from 1993-94.

== Career ==
In 2000, Smith began work on the first history of the gay carnival krewes of New Orleans, an important part of the celebration seldom included in the traditional narrative of the city’s carnival history. Unveiling the Muse: The Lost History of Gay Carnival in New Orleans was published in 2017 by the University Press of Mississippi and explores the origins of gay carnival and how the gay krewes were formed amid the repressive 1950s.

In 2020, A Sojourn in Paradise: Jack Robinson in 1950s New Orleans was published, a look at the work of photographer Jack Robinson when he lived in the city. These photographs reveal much about this time, especially the emerging gay community and the unique art scene. Smith has published one work of fiction entitled The Cult of the Mask; Or, the Strange and Delectable Tale of Life Among the Sybarites, which explores the subterranean gay community of New Orleans during the early 1980s. In addition, he has also compiled the first history of the Southern Decadence festival, an annual gay and lesbian celebration at the end of August, begun in 1972 as a friendly get-together in the Treme neighborhood.

In 2021, associate professor Robert Azzarello of Southern University of New Orleans contextualized the first gay historical publications of the city in a review essay in the Journal of the Louisiana Historical Association and cited two of Smith's works as important contributions.

His fifth publication, George Valentine Dureau: Life and Art in New Orleans, was published in March, 2025, by the University Press of Mississippi. This ambitious project not only focuses on Dureau's art and creative process but explores the exploding art scene of New Orleans during Dureau's lifetime. Thomas Uskali, in his review of the book, wrote that it "is gloriously overwhelming in its scope. [Smith's] writing builds from a sturdy backbone of scholarship and research that makes this an engrossing compendium."

== Publications ==
- A History of Empty Places (2011)
- Unveiling the Muse: The Lost History of Gay Carnival in New Orleans (2017) | Foreword by Henri Schindler
- Southern Decadence in New Orleans (2018) | With Frank Perez - Foreword by Robert Laurent
- The Cult of the Mask; Or, The Strange and Delectable Tale of Life Among the Sybarites (2019)
- A Sojourn in Paradise: Jack Robinson in 1950s New Orleans (2020) | Foreword by Emily Oppenheimer
- Louisiana Lens: Photographs from The Historic New Orleans Collection by John H. Lawrence (2023) | Featuring photography by H. P. Smith
- George Valentine Dureau: Life and Art in New Orleans (2025) | Foreword by Daniel Hammer
