= NMSH =

NMSH can refer to:

- North Miami High School ("North Miami Senior High")
- North Mississippi State Hospital
