= Oak Grove, Mississippi =

- Census-designated place
- Location within Mississippi Location within the United States
- Coordinates: 31°17′10″N 89°24′52″W
- Country: United States
- State: Mississippi
- County: Lamar

Area
  - Total: 1.25 sq mi (3.24 km^{2})
  - Land: 1.25 sq mi (3.24 km^{2})
  - Water: 0 sq mi (0.00 km^{2})
- Elevation: 407 ft (124 m)

Population (2020)
  - Total: 1,758
  - Density: 1,407.3/sq mi (543.36/km^{2})
- Time zone: UTC-6 (Central (CST))
  - Summer (DST): UTC-5 (CDT)
- ZIP codes: 39402, 39475
- Area codes: 601, 769
- GNIS feature ID: 675007

Oak Grove is a census-designated place and unincorporated community located in Lamar County, Mississippi, United States. The settlement is a suburb located immediately west of Hattiesburg.

Per the 2020 Census, the population was 1,758.

== History ==
Oak Grove experienced a growth in its population beginning in the 1970s as families from nearby Hattiesburg moved to the community. Schools, churches, businesses and newspapers were established, as were "the seeds of a long-running dispute about incorporation versus annexation by Hattiesburg".

In 1987, the city of Hattiesburg filed a petition seeking to expand its corporate boundaries into Oak Grove. In response, the "Oak Grove Concerned Citizens Association" filed a petition in favor of incorporating the City of Oak Grove. Both petitions were denied. In 1991, the petitions were appealed to the Supreme Court of Mississippi. Testimony at the appeal included the following:

If you look at a map, the political boundaries removed, you will think Oak Grove a part of Hattiesburg. If you drive through the area, Oak Grove will appear residential Hattiesburg. The phone company treats Oak Grove and Hattiesburg as one, Hattiesburg being the one. The Post Office has not given Oak Grove a zip code. If you follow the average Oak Grovian around, day by day, you will find that he works, plays, shops in Hattiesburg everything but "sleeps and pays taxes," and you will wonder why Oak Grove is not politically a part of Hattiesburg.

== Demographics ==
Historical population
Census	Pop.	Note	%±
2020	1,758		—
U.S. Decennial Census; 2020

Oak Grove was first listed as a census designated place in the 2020 U.S. census.

=== 2020 census ===
As of the 2020 census, Oak Grove had a population of 1,758. The median age was 32.6 years. 31.2% of residents were under the age of 18 and 10.1% of residents were 65 years of age or older. For every 100 females there were 76.7 males, and for every 100 females age 18 and over there were 69.1 males age 18 and over.

100.0% of residents lived in urban areas, while 0.0% lived in rural areas.

There were 647 households in Oak Grove, of which 42.7% had children under the age of 18 living in them. Of all households, 43.9% were married-couple households, 11.9% were households with a male householder and no spouse or partner present, and 39.1% were households with a female householder and no spouse or partner present. About 25.8% of all households were made up of individuals and 8.8% had someone living alone who was 65 years of age or older.

There were 685 housing units, of which 5.5% were vacant. The homeowner vacancy rate was 0.9% and the rental vacancy rate was 10.2%.

Oak Grove CDP, Mississippi – Racial and ethnic composition Note: the US Census treats Hispanic/Latino as an ethnic category. This table excludes Latinos from the racial categories and assigns them to a separate category. Hispanics/Latinos may be of any race.
Race / Ethnicity (NH = Non-Hispanic)	Pop 2020	% 2020
White alone (NH)	953	54.21%
Black or African American alone (NH)	597	33.96%
Native American or Alaska Native alone (NH)	2	0.11%
Asian alone (NH)	52	2.96%
Pacific Islander alone (NH)	1	0.06%
Some Other Race alone (NH)	8	0.46%
Mixed Race or Multi-Racial (NH)	72	4.10%
Hispanic or Latino (any race)	73	4.15%
Total	1,758	100.00%

== Education ==
Oak Grove is part of the Lamar County School District. Schools located in or near the community include:

- Oak Grove High School
- Oak Grove Middle School
- Oak Grove Upper Elementary
- Oak Grove Lower Elementary
- Longleaf Elementary (in West Hattiesburg)
- Oak Grove Primary

== Infrastructure ==
The Oak Grove Volunteer Fire Department is located in the community.
