= Arnold Line =

Arnold Line may refer to:

- Arnold Transit Company, a ferry boat company serving Mackinac Island in Michigan, also known as Arnold Line
- Arnold Line, Mississippi, Lamar County, Mississippi
