= Lamar County School District (Mississippi) =

School district in Mississippi

Coordinates: 31.136468°N 89.411587°W

The Lamar County School District (LCSD) is a public school district based in Purvis, in the U.S. state of Mississippi.

In addition to Purvis, the district also serves the town of Sumrall; the communities of Arnold Line, Baxterville, Lumberton, Oak Grove, and West Hattiesburg; and portions of Hattiesburg, as well as most rural areas in Lamar County. The district extends into Pearl River County, where it serves the rest of Lumberton.

== History ==
The Lumberton Public School District was disestablished, as per Governor of Mississippi Phil Bryant signing Senate Bill 2500, which required consolidation, in 2016.

Initially the Lumberton district, as per the senate bill, was to be dissolved effective July 1, 2019, with portions in Lamar County going to the Lamar County School District and Pearl River County portions to the Poplarville Separate School District. By 2018 the Lumberton and Lamar county districts chose to do a voluntary consolidation, effective July 1, 2018, where the entirety of the students living in the Lumberton district, including those in both counties, would continue going to Lumberton school buildings operated by the Lamar district. Poplarville's school board as well as the Pearl River County Board sued to stop the voluntary merger so the school district could obtain a portion of the Lumberton district, but the lawsuit was dismissed. Pearl River County Supervisor Hudson Holliday states that if the Lamar County district later closes Lumberton High School, several Pearl River County students would be assigned to Purvis High School even though Poplarville High School is geographically closer to them.

== Schools ==
High schools (grades 9–12)

- Lumberton High School
- Oak Grove High School
- Purvis High School (Grades 9–12)
- Sumrall High School (grades 9–12)

K-8 schools

- Baxterville School

Middle schools (grades 6–8)

- Lumberton Middle School
- Oak Grove Middle School
- Purvis Middle School
- Sumrall Middle School

Elementary schools

- Lumberton Elementary School (Grades K-5)
- Sumrall Elementary School (Grades K-5)
- Oak Grove Elementary School (Grades K-5)
- Bellevue Elementary School (Grades K-5)
- Longleaf Elementary School (Grades K-5)
- Purvis Upper Elementary School (Grades 3–5)
- Purvis Lower Elementary School (Grades K-2)

== Demographics ==
=== 2006-07 school year ===
There were a total of 7,697 students enrolled in the Lamar County School District during the 2006–2007 school year. The gender makeup of the district was 48% female and 52% male. The racial makeup of the district was 18.57% African American, 77.78% White, 2.18% Hispanic, 1.38% Asian, and 0.09% Native American. 28.7% of the district's students were eligible to receive free lunch.

=== Previous school years ===
| School Year | Enrollment | Gender Makeup | | Racial Makeup | | | | |
| School Year | Enrollment | Female | Male | Asian | African American | Hispanic | Native American | White |
|---|---|---|---|---|---|---|---|---|
| 2005-06 | 7,517 | 48% | 52% | 1.29% | 17.83% | 2.06% | 0.05% | 78.77% |
| 2004-05 | 7,191 | 48% | 52% | 1.11% | 16.19% | 1.79% | 0.04% | 80.86% |
| 2003-04 | 7,021 | 48% | 52% | 0.85% | 14.49% | 1.28% | 0.11% | 83.26% |
| 2002-03 | 6,757 | 48% | 52% | 0.98% | 13.54% | 0.90% | 0.12% | 84.46% |

== Accountability statistics ==
| | 2006-07 | 2005-06 | 2004-05 | 2003-04 | 2002-03 |
|---|---|---|---|---|---|
| District Accreditation Status | Accredited | Accredited | Accredited | Accredited | Accredited |
School Performance Classifications
| Level 5 (Superior Performing) Schools | 4 | 7 | 6 | 7 | 5 |
| Level 4 (Exemplary) Schools | 3 | 3 | 4 | 3 | 5 |
| Level 3 (Successful) Schools | 3 | 0 | 0 | 0 | 0 |
| Level 2 (Under Performing) Schools | 0 | 0 | 0 | 0 | 0 |
| Level 1 (Low Performing) Schools | 0 | 0 | 0 | 0 | 0 |
| Not Assigned | 0 | 0 | 0 | 0 | 0 |

== See also ==
- List of school districts in Mississippi
