= Gay Mardi Gras =

Events commonly referred to as the Gay Mardi Gras include:

- Southern Decadence, in New Orleans
- Sydney Mardi Gras, in Sydney (formerly known as Sydney Gay and Lesbian Mardi Gras)
