= List of hospitals in Mississippi =

Notable hospitals in the state of Mississippi

This is a list of hospitals in Mississippi (U.S. state), sorted by hospital name.

== Hospitals ==
The American Hospital Directory lists 122 hospitals in Mississippi.

Hospital	City	County	Hospital beds	Trauma designation	Critical Access Hospital	Notes
81st Medical Group - Keesler Medical Center	Biloxi	Harrison	60	None	No	Located on Keesler Air Force Base
Alliance Health Center	Meridian	Lauderdale	154	None	No	Inpatient adult and adolescent psychiatric facility. Founded in 1961 as the Sisters of St. Joseph Hospital. Became a psychiatric-only facility in 1989.
Alliance Hospital	Holly Springs	Marshall	40	Level IV	No	
Allegiance Specialty Hospital of Greenville	Greenville	Washington	39	None	No	Long-term acute care facility
Baptist Anderson Regional Medical Center	Meridian	Lauderdale	260	Level III	No	Also known as Anderson Regional Medical Center-North. Scheduled to merge with Baptist Memorial Health Care in January 2024.
Anderson Regional Medical Center-South	Meridian	Lauderdale	69	None	No	Formerly Riley Memorial Hospital. Purchased by Anderson Regional Medical Center in 2010.
Baptist Memorial Hospital-Attala	Kosciusko	Attala	25	Level IV	Yes	Founded in 1938 as Montfort Jones Memorial Hospital. Purchased by Baptist Health Systems in 2015.
Baptist Memorial Hospital-Booneville	Booneville	Prentiss	54	Level IV	No	
Baptist Memorial Hospital-Calhoun	Calhoun City	Calhoun	25	Level IV	Yes	
Baptist Memorial Hospital-DeSoto	Southaven	DeSoto	329	Level III	No	
Baptist Memorial Hospital-Golden Triangle	Columbus	Lowndes	211	Level III	No	
Baptist Memorial Hospital-Leake	Carthage	Leake	25	Level IV	Yes	Formerly known as Leake Memorial Hospital. Purchased by Mississippi Baptist Health Systems in 2011.
Baptist Memorial Hospital-North Mississippi	Oxford	Lafayette	184	Level III	No	Moved into new facility at 1100 Belk Boulevard in November 2017. The University of Mississippi purchased the former location and converted it into academic space.
Baptist Memorial Hospital-Union County	New Albany	Union	92	Level IV	No	Founded as Union County General Hospital in 1966. Purchased by Baptist Memorial Health Care in 1987.
Baptist Memorial Hospital-Yazoo	Yazoo City	Yazoo	25	Level IV	Yes	Founded in 1922 as King's Daughters Hospital. Purchased by Baptist Health System in 2015.
Batson Children's Hospital	Jackson	Hinds	130	Level I-Pediatric	No	First built in 1968 as Mississippi's only children's hospital. Currently constructing expansion, which will increase operating, clinic, ICU and neonatal ICU rooms.
Beacham Memorial Hospital	Magnolia	Pike	31	None	No	
Bolivar Medical Center	Cleveland	Bolivar	164	Level IV	No	
Brentwood Behavioral Healthcare of Mississippi	Flowood	Rankin	105	None	No	Inpatient pediatric and adult psychiatric facility
Central Mississippi Residential Center	Newton	Newton	72	None	No	Inpatient adult psychiatric facility operated by the Mississippi Department of Mental Health.
Choctaw Health Center	Philadelphia	Neshoba	20	None	No	Operated by the Mississippi Band of Choctaw Indians.
Choctaw Regional Medical Center	Ackerman	Choctaw	88	Level IV	Yes	
Claiborne County Medical Center	Port Gibson	Claiborne	32	Level IV	Yes	
Conerly Critical Care Hospital	Jackson	Hinds	92	None	No	Houses UMMC's Medical ICU, Surgical ICU, Cardiac ICU, Neuroscience ICU, and bone marrow transplant units.
Copiah County Medical Center	Hazlehurst	Copiah	25	Level IV	Yes	First built in 1950 as Hardy Wilson Memorial Hospital with funding from the Hill–Burton Act. Name changed to Copiah County Medical Center in 2016.
Covington County Hospital	Collins	Covington	25	Level IV	Yes	
CrossRoads Behavioral Health	Batesville	Panola	57	None	No	Inpatient adult psychiatric facility
Delta Regional Medical Center	Greenville	Washington	215	Level III	No	
Diamond Grove Center	Louisville	Winston	25	None	No	Inpatient pediatric psychiatric facility
East Mississippi State Hospital	Meridian	Lauderdale	372	None	No	Inpatient pediatric and adult psychiatric facility. The hospital also operates two group homes in DeKalb.
Encompass Health Rehabilitation Hospital	Gulfport	Harrison	33	None	No	Inpatient rehabilitation facility
Field Memorial Community Hospital	Centreville	Amite and Wilkinson	16	Level IV	Yes	
Forrest General Hospital	Hattiesburg	Forrest	473	Level II	No	
Franklin County Memorial Hospital	Meadville	Franklin	24	Level IV	Yes	
G. V. (Sonny) Montgomery VA Medical Center	Jackson	Hinds	163	None	No	
George Regional Hospital	Lucedale	George	42	Level IV	No	
Greene County Hospital	Leakesville	Greene	7	Level IV	Yes	
Greenwood Leflore Hospital	Greenwood	Leflore	208	Level IV	No	
Gulf Coast Veterans Health Care System	Biloxi	Harrison	288	None	No	Also operates four community-based outpatient clinics in Mobile, Pensacola, Fort Walton Beach, and Panama City
Gulfport Behavioral Health System	Gulfport	Harrison	52	None	No	Inpatient pediatric and adult psychiatric facility
H. C. Watkins Memorial Hospital	Quitman	Clarke	25	Level IV	Yes	
Highland Community Hospital	Picayune	Pearl River	49	Level IV	No	Opened in 1955 as L. O. Crosby Memorial Hospital.
Jasper General Hospital	Bay Springs	Jasper	20	None	No	
Jefferson Comprehensive Health Center	Fayette	Jefferson	30	None	No	
Jefferson Davis Community Hospital	Prentiss	Jefferson Davis	25	Level IV	Yes	Previously known as Prentiss Regional Hospital.
John C. Stennis Memorial Hospital	DeKalb	Kemper	25	Level IV	Yes	
King's Daughters Medical Center	Brookhaven	Lincoln	90	Level IV	No	
KPC Promise of Vicksburg	Vicksburg	Warren	35	None	No	Long-term acute care facility located within Merit Health River Region. Known as Promise Specialty Hospital of Vicksburg until 2019, when it was acquired by KPC Healthcare.
Lackey Memorial Hospital	Forest	Scott	35	Level IV	Yes	
Laird Hospital	Union	Newton	25	Level IV	Yes	
Lawrence County Hospital	Monticello	Lawrence	25	Level IV	Yes	
Magee General Hospital	Magee	Simpson	44	Level IV	No	
Magnolia Regional Health Center	Corinth	Alcorn	182	Level III	No	
Marion General Hospital	Columbia	Marion	49	Level IV	No	
Memorial Hospital at Biloxi	Biloxi	Harrison	147	Level III	No	Opened in 1963 as Howard Memorial Hospital. Name changed to Biloxi Regional Medical Center in 1981. Purchased by Community Health Systems in 2015 and name changed to Merit Health Biloxi. Purchased by Memorial Hospital at Gulfport in 2025 and name changed to Memorial Hospital at Biloxi.
Memorial Hospital at Gulfport	Gulfport	Harrison	432	Level II	No	
Memorial Hospital at Stone County	Wiggins	Stone	25	Level IV	Yes	Originally known as Stone County Hospital, but name changed to Memorial Hospital at Stone County after being leased by Memorial Hospital at Gulfport in 2019.
Merit Health Central	Jackson	Hinds	319	Level III	No	First opened as Hinds General Hospital, then Central Mississippi Medical Center. The 35-bed Burn and Reconstructive Centers of America at Merit Health is located within Merit Health Central. It is the only burn center located in Mississippi.
Merit Health Madison	Canton	Madison	67	Level IV	No	Originally named King's Daughters Hospital prior to the name being changed to Madison County Medical Center. In 2015 was renamed Merit Health Madison.
Merit Health Natchez	Natchez	Adams	179	Level IV	No	Opened in 1960 as Natchez Regional Medical Center. Name changed to Merit Health Natchez after being purchased by Community Health Systems in 2015.
Merit Health Rankin	Brandon	Rankin	134	Level IV	No	Opened in 1969 as Rankin General Hospital. Name then changed to Rankin Medical Center, then Crossgates River Oaks Hospital in 2008. In 2015 was renamed Merit Health Rankin.
Merit Health River Oaks	Flowood	Rankin	158	Level III	No	Originally opened as River Oaks Hospital. Name changed to Merit Health River Oaks in 2015.
Merit Health River Region	Vicksburg	Warren	321	Level IV	No	Formed in 2002 as River Region Medical Center from the consolidation of ParkView Regional Medical Center and Vicksburg Medical Center. Name changed to Merit Health River Region in 2015.
Merit Health Wesley	Hattiesburg	Lamar	167	Level III	No	First opened in 1900 as the Ross Sanitarium. Renamed Gulf and Ship Island Railroad Employees Hospital in 1903. Subsequently, known as Hattiesburg Hospital, King's Daughters Hospital, Methodist Hospital, and Wesley Medical Center. Became Merit Health Wesley in 2015.
Merit Health Woman's Hospital	Flowood	Rankin	33	None	No	Opened in 1975 as Woman's Hospital. Name changed to Merit Health Woman's Hospital in 2015.
Methodist Olive Branch Hospital	Olive Branch	DeSoto	53	Level IV	No	
Methodist Rehabilitation Center	Jackson	Hinds	124	None	No	Inpatient rehabilitation facility
Mississippi Baptist Medical Center	Jackson	Hinds	440	Level IV	No	Originally opened as Mississippi Baptist Hospital. Now part of Baptist Health Services of Memphis
Mississippi State Hospital	Whitfield	Rankin	139	None	No	Inpatient pediatric and adult psychiatric facility
Monroe Regional Hospital	Aberdeen	Monroe	35	Level IV	Yes	Formerly known as Aberdeen-Monroe County Hospital. Name changed in 2016 from Pioneer Community Hospital of Aberdeen.
Neshoba County General Hospital	Philadelphia	Neshoba	208	Level IV	No	
North Mississippi Medical Center-Eupora	Eupora	Webster	38	Level IV	No	Originally named Webster Hospital prior to name being changed to Webster Health Services. Name changed to North Mississippi Medical Center-Eupora after signing lease agreement with North Mississippi Health Services.
North Mississippi Medical Center-Gilmore-Amory	Amory	Monroe	94	Level IV	No	Founded in 1919 as Gilmore Memorial Hospital. Name changed to North Mississippi Medical Center Gilmore-Amory in 2019.
North Mississippi Medical Center-Iuka	Iuka	Tishomingo	66	Level IV	No	Originally known as Iuka Hospital
North Mississippi Medical Center-Pontotoc	Pontotoc	Pontotoc	25	Level IV	Yes	Previously known as Pontotoc Community Hospital.
North Mississippi Medical Center-Tupelo	Tupelo	Lee	630	Level II	No	Founded in 1937 as North Mississippi Community Hospital. Name changed to North Mississippi Medical Center in 1967. Total bed numbers include North Mississippi Medical Center Women's Hospital.
North Mississippi Medical Center-West Point	West Point	Clay	49	Level IV	No	Previously known as Ivy Memorial Hospital, then Clay County Medical Center.
North Mississippi State Hospital	Tupelo	Lee	50	None	No	Inpatient adult psychiatric facility
North Sunflower Medical Center	Ruleville	Sunflower	35	Level IV	Yes	Founded in 1950 as North Sunflower County Hospital. Name changed to North Sunflower Medical Center in 2004.
Northwest Mississippi Medical Center	Clarksdale	Coahoma	181	Level IV	No	
Noxubee General Hospital	Macon	Noxubee	25	Level IV	Yes	Previously known as Noxubee County Hospital.
Ocean Springs Hospital	Ocean Springs	Jackson	136	Level III	No	
Oceans Behavioral Hospital Biloxi	Biloxi	Harrison	45	None	No	Inpatient adolescent and adult psychiatric facility. Formerly known as Merit Health Gulf Oaks, Gulf Oaks Psychiatric Hospital, and Gulf Coast Medical Center.
OCH Regional Medical Center	Starkville	Oktibbeha	88	Level III	No	
Ochsner Medical Center-Hancock	Bay St. Louis	Hancock	51	Level IV	No	First opened in 1960 as Hancock General Hospital before the name was changed to Hancock Medical Center. Renamed Ochsner Medical Center-Hancock in 2018.
Ochsner Rush Health	Meridian	Lauderdale	182	Level III	No	First opened in 1915 as Rush Infirmary. Name changed to Rush Memorial Hospital in 1947, then Rush Foundation Hospital in 1965. Rush Health System announced merger with Ochsner Health System in 2021. When merger is complete in 2022, will be known as Ochsner Rush Health.
Panola Medical Center	Batesville	Panola	67	Level IV	No	
Parkwood Behavioral Health System	Olive Branch	DeSoto	108	None	No	Inpatient pediatric and adult psychiatric facility
Pascagoula Hospital	Pascagoula	Jackson	398	Level III	No	Opened in 1931 as Jackson County Hospital. Formerly known as Singing River Hospital.
Patient's Choice Medical Center of Smith County	Raleigh	Smith	29	None	No	
Pearl River County Hospital	Poplarville	Pearl River	24	Level IV	Yes	
Perry County General Hospital	Richton	Perry	22	Level IV	Yes	
Regency Meridian	Meridian	Lauderdale	40	None	No	Long-term acute care facility located on the second floor of Anderson Regional Medical Center South.
St. Dominic Hospital	Jackson	Hinds	571	Level IV	No	Organized as the Jackson Infirmary in 1916 and consolidated with the Jackson Sanitarium in 1924. Sold to the Dominican Sisters of Springfield, Illinois in 1946 and renamed St. Dominic Hospital in 1954.
Scott Regional Hospital	Morton	Scott	25	Level IV	Yes	
Select Specialty Hospital-Belhaven	Jackson	Hinds	25	None	No	Long-term acute care facility located on the fifth floor of Mississippi Baptist Medical Center.
Select Specialty Hospital-Gulfport	Gulfport	Harrison	61	None	No	Long-term acute care facility
Select Specialty Hospital-Jackson	Jackson	Hinds	53	None	No	Long-term acute care facility
Sharkey Issaquena Community Hospital	Rolling Fork	Sharkey	83	Level IV	Yes	
Simpson General Hospital	Mendenhall	Simpson	35	Level IV	Yes	
Singing River Gulfport	Gulfport	Harrison	121	Level III	No	Formerly known as Garden Park Medical Center. Purchased by Singing River Health System in 2021 and name changed to Singing River Gulfport.
South Central Regional Medical Center	Laurel	Jones	268	Level III	No	
South Mississippi State Hospital	Purvis	Lamar	45	None	No	Inpatient adult psychiatric facility
South Sunflower County Hospital	Indianola	Sunflower	47	Level IV	No	
Southwest Mississippi Regional Medical Center	McComb	Pike	160	Level IV	No	
Tallahatchie General Hospital	Charleston	Tallahatchie	9	Level IV	Yes	Founded in 1937 as Tallahatchie County Hospital.
The Specialty Hospital of Meridian	Meridian	Lauderdale	49	None	No	Long-term acute care facility located on the first floor of Rush Foundation Hospital.
Tippah County Hospital	Ripley	Tippah	65	Level IV	Yes	
Trace Regional Hospital	Houston	Chickasaw	120	None	No	
Turning Point Mature Adult Care Unit	Louisville	Winston	10	None	No	Inpatient geriatric psychiatric facility located on the third floor of Winston Medical Center.
Tyler Holmes Memorial Hospital	Winona	Montgomery	25	Level IV	Yes	
UMMC Grenada	Grenada	Grenada	49	Level IV	No	Founded in 1923 as Grenada Hospital. In 1965 the name was changed to Grenada County Hospital, then Grenada Lake Medical Center. Renamed UMMC Grenada in 2014.
UMMC Holmes County	Lexington	Holmes	25	Level IV	Yes	Opened in 1950 as Holmes County Community Hospital. Name changed to Holmes County Hospital in 1981, then UMMC Holmes County.
University of Mississippi Medical Center	Jackson	Hinds	698	Level I	No	
Walthall County General Hospital	Tylertown	Walthall	25	Level IV	Yes	
Wayne General Hospital	Waynesboro	Wayne	49	Level IV	No	
West Campus of Delta Regional Medical Center	Greenville	Washington	113	None	No	First opened in 1927 as King's Daughters Hospital. Name changed in 2005 after being purchased by Delta Regional Medical Center.
Whitfield Medical Surgical Hospital	Whitfield	Rankin	32	None	No	Provides acute inpatient medical services to facilities operated by the Mississippi Department of Mental Health.
Winston Medical Center	Louisville	Winston	144	Level IV	No	First opened in 1958 as Winston County Community Hospital. Name changed to Winston Medical Center in 1994.
Wiser Hospital for Women and Infants	Jackson	Hinds		None	No	Houses Mississippi's only Level IV neonatal ICU.
Yalobusha General Hospital	Water Valley	Yalobusha	26	None	No	

== Defunct hospitals ==
Hospital name	City	County	Hospital beds	Year founded	Year closed	Notes
Afro-American Sons and Daughters Hospital	Yazoo City	Yazoo	50	1928	1972	First hospital built in Mississippi specifically to serve African-Americans. Placed on the National Register of Historic Places in 2006.
Baldwyn Satellite Hospital	Baldwyn	Lee	49	1969	1991	Hospital site now used as the Baldwyn Nursing Home Facility.
Cosby Clinic and Hospital	Iuka	Tishomingo	9	1949	1976	First hospital in Tishomingo County.
Gulf Coast Medical Center	Biloxi	Harrison	144	1976	2008	Severely damaged during Hurricane Katrina.
Itawamba County Hospital	Fulton	Itawamba	62	Early 1960s	Early 1990s	Also known as Fulton Family Medical Center. Hospital building now used as a nursing home.
Kilmichael Hospital	Kilmichael	Montgomery	19	1955	2015	Built with funding from the Hill-Burton Act. Now operated as a medical clinic.
Kuhn Memorial State Hospital	Vicksburg	Warren	84	1847	1989	Founded in 1847 as the Vicksburg City Hospital. Came under control of the University of Mississippi in 1908 and name changed to Mississippi State Charity Hospital. Renamed Kuhn Memorial in 1954.
Matty Hersee Hospital	Meridian	Lauderdale	68	1892	1989	Also known as East Mississippi Charity Hospital. Concurrently operated the Matty Hersee School of Nursing until 1977. After closing, Meridian Community College obtained ownership of the property.
Mercy Hospital	Vicksburg	Warren	200	1943	2002	Founded by the Sisters of Mercy. Sold in 1991 and renamed ParkView Regional Medical Center. Closed in February 2002.
Natchez Community Hospital	Natchez	Adams	101	1973	2015	Opened as Natchez Humana Hospital. Name changed to Natchez Community Hospital, then Merit Health Natchez-Community Campus. Consolidated with Natchez Regional Medical Center to form Merit Health Natchez.
North Oak Regional Medical Center	Senatobia	Tate	76	1975	2018	Also known as Senatobia Community Hospital.
Okolona Community Hospital	Okolona	Chickasaw	10		2003	Hospital building now used as a nursing home.
Patient's Choice Medical Center of Humphreys County	Belzoni	Humphreys	34	1951	2013	First operated as Humphreys County Memorial Hospital.
Pioneer Community Hospital of Newton	Newton	Newton	30	1952	2015	Named Newton Regional Hospital, then name changed to Rush Hospital Newton. Name changed back to Newton Regional Hospital, then Pioneer Community Hospital of Newton.
Quitman County Hospital	Marks	Quitman	33	1978	2016	
Regency Hospital of Jackson	Jackson	Hinds	36		2016	Long-term acute care facility. Was located on the 6th floor of St. Dominic Hospital. Moved services to Select Specialty Hospital of Jackson upon closing.
Riley Memorial Hospital	Meridian	Lauderdale	140	1930	2010	Was the first women's and children's hospital in Mississippi. Bought by Anderson Regional Medical Center in 2010.
St. Joseph's Hospital	Meridian	Lauderdale	154	1961	1989	Name changed to Meridian Regional Hospital in 1977. Upon closing, became psychiatric-only facility and was renamed Alliance Health Center.
Taborian Hospital	Mound Bayou	Bolivar	42	1942	1983	Founded by the Mississippi jurisdiction of the International Order of Twelve Knights and Daughters of Tabor. Merged with the Friendship Clinic and renamed Mound Bayou Community Hospital in 1967.
Turner Hospital	Meridian	Lauderdale	50	1910	1929	Purchased by Dr. Jeff Anderson in 1929 and renamed Anderson Infirmary.

== Note ==
1.Bed count included in University of Mississippi Medical Center's total bed count.
