= Mississippi Baptist Medical Center =

Hospital in Jackson, Mississippi, U.S.

- Baptist Memorial Health Care

Geography
- Location: 1225 North State Street, Jackson, Mississippi, United States
- Coordinates: 32°18′54″N 90°10′46″W

Organization
- Type: General

Services
- Emergency department: Level III trauma center
- Beds: 638

History
- Founded: 1908

Links
- Website: www.baptistonline.org/locations/jackson
- Lists: Hospitals in Mississippi

Mississippi Baptist Medical Center is a 638-bed nonprofit general hospital in Jackson, Mississippi, and part of Baptist Memorial Health Care. The hospital traces its origins to a clinic established in 1908 and is the oldest hospital in Jackson.

Mississippi Baptist Medical Center serves as a regional referral hospital and provides emergency, cancer, cardiovascular, women's, pediatric, and other specialty medical services for central Mississippi.

== History ==
=== Origins ===
Mississippi Baptist Medical Center traces its origins to a clinic established in Jackson, Mississippi, in 1908 by physicians Dr. James B. Guthrie and Dr. J. T. Christian. The clinic initially operated from an eight-room frame house before being accepted by the Mississippi Baptist Convention in 1911. In 1914, a new two-story brick hospital opened and became known as the Mississippi Baptist Hospital.

=== Campus development ===
Construction of the hospital's current campus on North State Street began in 1972, and the present medical center opened in January 1976. The former hospital complex was demolished in 1985, and the Medical Arts East Building was completed in 1989 as the campus continued to expand.

=== Baptist Memorial Health Care ===
In 2017, Mississippi Baptist Health Systems merged with Baptist Memorial Health Care, creating one of the largest nonprofit health systems in the United States. Following the merger, Mississippi Baptist Medical Center became part of the Baptist Memorial Health Care system and continues to serve as one of its largest hospitals in Mississippi.

== Services and facilities ==
Mississippi Baptist Medical Center is a 638-bed general hospital that provides inpatient, outpatient, emergency, diagnostic, and surgical services. Major specialty programs include Baptist Cancer Center, Baptist Heart, Baptist for Women, and a range of medical and surgical specialty services.

In 2023, the Mississippi State Department of Health designated Mississippi Baptist Medical Center as a Level III trauma center, a primary pediatric trauma center, and a burn center, expanding the hospital's role within the state's trauma system.

The hospital has received Magnet Recognition from the American Nurses Credentialing Center for excellence in nursing and has been recognized by Becker's Hospital Review among its annual lists of leading hospitals in the United States.

== Education and training ==
Mississippi Baptist Medical Center serves as a clinical education site for students and health care professionals through its affiliation with Baptist Health Sciences University. The hospital also operates a School of Medical Laboratory Science, which was established in 1946 and provides clinical training for future medical laboratory professionals.
