= Baxterville, Mississippi =

- Census-designated place
- Location within Mississippi Location within the United States
- Coordinates: 31°05′03″N 89°35′25″W
- Country: United States
- State: Mississippi
- County: Lamar

Area
  - Total: 3.15 sq mi (8.2 km^{2})
  - Land: 3.15 sq mi (8.2 km^{2})
  - Water: 0.006 sq mi (0.016 km^{2})
- Elevation: 407 ft (124 m)

Population (2020)
  - Total: 267
  - Density: 84.7/sq mi (32.7/km^{2})
- Time zone: UTC-6 (Central (CST))
  - Summer (DST): UTC-5 (CDT)
- Area code: 601
- GNIS feature ID: 666577
- FIPS code: 28-03940

Baxterville is a census-designated place and unincorporated community in Lamar County, Mississippi. It is located in the southwestern portion of Lamar County along Mississippi Highway 13, southwest of Hattiesburg.

The community is also home to several churches and cemeteries.

Little Black Creek Water Park is located nearby off the Purvis-Baxterville Road. The park offers camping sites, picnic areas, swimming, fishing, and a nature trail. It is open Wednesday to Sunday and is a part of the Pat Harrison Waterway District. Access to the park can also be gained from Interstate 59 through Lumberton, MS.

Per the 2020 Census, the population was 267.

== History ==
Baxterville was a stop on the Gulf and Ship Island Railroad. The population in 1906 was estimated at 150. Around that time, the settlement had a turpentine still and two saw mills.

=== Nuclear weapon testing ===
At 10:00 a.m. on October 22, 1964, the United States Atomic Energy Commission detonated an underground nuclear device inside the Tatum Salt Dome, near Baxterville (Project Salmon). The plan was to detonate a single nuclear bomb about 2,700 feet down within solid salt. Two miles from the test site the blast shook pecans off the pecan trees, and homes, barns, and other buildings near the test site saw major to severe damage. About 400 residents were evacuated from around the test site for the day. At the test site, creeks ran black with silt-laden water, and seven days after the blast, more than 400 nearby residents had filed damage claims with the government, reporting that their homes had been damaged or that their water wells had gone dry. Project Salmon was considered a success, with the bomb delivering the same force as 5,000 tons of TNT, approximately one-third as powerful as the bomb that destroyed Hiroshima in 1945. The shock wave was felt in downtown Hattiesburg, almost 30 miles away. The bomb blasted a spherical cavity about 110 feet in diameter inside the salt dome, creating a cavern. This cavern was used for a second nuclear test within the salt dome on December 3, 1966 (Project Sterling) which had the force of 350 tons of TNT. These two underground nuclear explosions were the only ones executed on U.S. soil east of the Rocky Mountains. The Tatum Salt Dome site saw two additional tests by the Atomic Energy Commission as a part of Project Miracle Play. Project Miracle Play was similar to Project Dribble in that it too was designed to detect underground testing, but this time the two blasts were conventional bombs instead of nuclear. Mississippi’s two explosions in Project Miracle Play in 1969 and 1970 were fueled by a mixture of oxygen and methane.

== Demographics ==
Historical population
Census	Pop.	Note	%±
2020	267		—
U.S. Decennial Census; 2020

Baxterville first appeared as a census designated place in the 2020 U.S. census.

=== 2020 census ===
Baxterville CDP, Mississippi – Racial and ethnic composition Note: the US Census treats Hispanic/Latino as an ethnic category. This table excludes Latinos from the racial categories and assigns them to a separate category. Hispanics/Latinos may be of any race.
Race / Ethnicity (NH = Non-Hispanic)	Pop 2020	% 2020
White alone (NH)	253	94.76%
Black or African American alone (NH)	2	0.75%
Native American or Alaska Native alone (NH)	0	0.00%
Asian alone (NH)	0	0.00%
Pacific Islander alone (NH)	0	0.00%
Some Other Race alone (NH)	2	0.75%
Mixed Race or Multi-Racial (NH)	6	2.25%
Hispanic or Latino (any race)	4	1.50%
Total	267	100.00%

== Education ==
The community has one school, Baxterville School, which is part of the Lamar County School District, and serves students in grades kindergarten through eighth.
