= Oloh, Mississippi =

- Unincorporated community
- Location within Mississippi Location within the United States
- Coordinates: 31°17′49″N 89°35′24″W
- Country: United States
- State: Mississippi
- County: Lamar
- Elevation: 413 ft (126 m)
- Time zone: UTC-6 (Central (CST))
  - Summer (DST): UTC-5 (CDT)
- ZIP code: 39482
- Area code: 601
- GNIS feature ID: 675286

Oloh is an unincorporated community located in Lamar County, Mississippi, United States. Oloh is approximately 12 miles (19 km) west of West Hattiesburg near U.S. Route 98 and a part of the Hattiesburg, Mississippi Metropolitan Statistical Area.

In 1907, Oloh had two churches, a school, and a turpentine plant. A post office operated under the name Oloh from 1895 to 1920.

Oloh is served by a community center that also doubles as a voting precinct.
