= Sumrall, Mississippi =

- Town
- Location of Sumrall, Mississippi

- Location in the United States
- Coordinates: 31°25′7″N 89°32′47″W
- Country: United States
- State: Mississippi
- County: Lamar

Area
  - Total: 3.76 sq mi (9.73 km^{2})
  - Land: 3.75 sq mi (9.70 km^{2})
  - Water: 0.012 sq mi (0.03 km^{2})
- Elevation: 292 ft (89 m)

Population (2020)
  - Total: 1,765
  - Density: 471.4/sq mi (182.01/km^{2})
- Time zone: UTC-6 (Central (CST))
  - Summer (DST): UTC-5 (CDT)
- ZIP code: 39482
- Area code: 601
- FIPS code: 28-71560
- GNIS feature ID: 0678406
- Website: www.sumrallms.org

Sumrall is a town in Lamar County, Mississippi. It is part of the Hattiesburg, Mississippi Metropolitan Statistical Area. Also known as the "Pine Town". As of the 2020 census, Sumrall had a population of 1,765.

== History ==
Sumrall was one of many new towns incorporated along the Mississippi Central Railroad during the first decade of the 20th century. Prior to the arrival of the railroad, founder Daniel Sumrall operated a grist mill along Mill Creek. In 1890, the federal government established a post office in the community and named it Sumrall. The J. J. Newman Company, headed by Fenwick Peck, chose the site as the location for a large sawmill. Situated in the heart of South Mississippi's pine belt, the location was ideal for just such a large mill. Evidence of the quality of timber in the area is supported by a prize-winning short leaf pine displayed at the 1904 World's Fair in St. Louis. The tree was 160 feet tall, measured 20 feet in circumference and was 6 feet eight inches in diameter. With the arrival of the railroad, the town grew quickly and petitioned for incorporation as a town; this wish was granted by the Mississippi Legislature on October 6, 1902. Some early residents wanted to change the name of the town because, although Daniel Sumrall was a native of Perry County in Mississippi, he had served in the Civil War as a Union soldier. The federal government had the final choice in the matter and, as they refused to change the name of the post office, any change in the name of the city would have been meaningless.

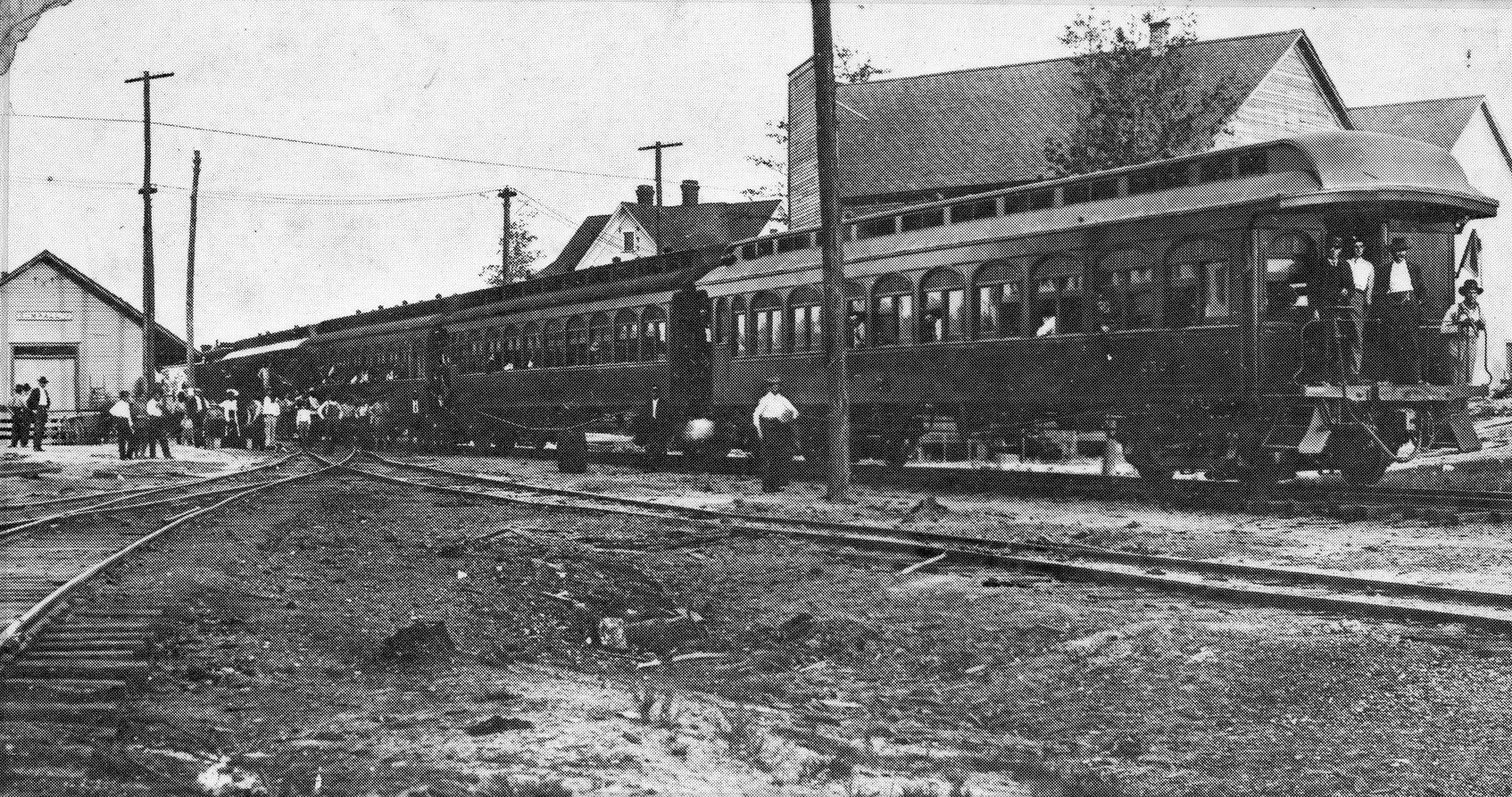
Mississippi Central Railroad passenger train in Sumrall, early 1900s.

For nearly 30 years the Newman Lumber Company was the main industry of the city. As the timber industry was a "cut out and get out" operation at this time, when the mill depleted the profitable timber supply it ceased operation in 1931. Combined with the Great Depression, the shutdown of the mill had a marked impact on the town and left it with no large employer for nearly 20 years. In 1949, the Movie Star Company opened a woman's lingerie plant in nearby Purvis, and soon opened a similar plant in Sumrall which provided stable employment for many local women until the 1990s. The population of the city remained flat or declined from 1940-2000. As the metropolitan area of Hattiesburg has expanded westward, Sumrall is now once again experiencing economic growth. The Longleaf Trace, a recreational trail which follows the route of the former Mississippi Central Railroad, runs through the center of town. The Longleaf Trace extends from Hattiesburg, MS to Prentiss Mississippi and is popular with cyclists, hikers, and horseback riders.

In 2017 Cooperative Energy opened a solar farm (photovoltaic power station) near Sumrall.

== Geography ==
According to the United States Census Bureau, the town has a total area of 2.2 square miles (5.7 km^{2}), of which 2.1 square miles (5.4 km^{2}) is land and 0.47% is water.

=== Climate ===
The climate in this area is characterized by relatively high temperatures and evenly distributed precipitation throughout the year. According to the Köppen Climate Classification system, Sumrall has a humid subtropical climate, abbreviated "Cfa" on climate maps.

== Demographics ==
Historical population
Census	Pop.	Note	%±
1910	2,046		—
1920	1,444		−29.4%
1930	1,364		−5.5%
1940	819		−40.0%
1950	853		4.2%
1960	797		−6.6%
1970	955		19.8%
1980	1,197		25.3%
1990	903		−24.6%
2000	1,005		11.3%
2010	1,421		41.4%
2020	1,765		24.2%
U.S. Decennial Census

=== 2020 census ===
As of the 2020 census, Sumrall had a population of 1,765. The median age was 33.2 years. 31.6% of residents were under the age of 18 and 11.8% of residents were 65 years of age or older. For every 100 females, there were 89.6 males, and for every 100 females age 18 and over there were 84.6 males age 18 and over.

0.0% of residents lived in urban areas, while 100.0% lived in rural areas.

There were 625 households in Sumrall, of which 50.7% had children under the age of 18 living in them. Of all households, 55.7% were married-couple households, 13.0% were households with a male householder and no spouse or partner present, and 27.5% were households with a female householder and no spouse or partner present. About 21.3% of all households were made up of individuals and 8.8% had someone living alone who was 65 years of age or older.

There were 683 housing units, of which 8.5% were vacant. The homeowner vacancy rate was 1.0% and the rental vacancy rate was 13.1%.

Sumrall racial composition
Race	Num.	Perc.
White (non-Hispanic)	1,385	78.47%
Black or African American (non-Hispanic)	275	15.58%
Native American	3	0.17%
Asian	5	0.28%
Other/Mixed	56	3.17%
Hispanic or Latino	41	2.32%

=== 2000 census ===
At the 2000 census, there were 1,005 people, 406 households and 265 families residing in the town. The population density was 468.6 inhabitants per square mile (180.9/km^{2}). There were 436 housing units at an average density of 203.3 per square mile (78.5/km^{2}). The racial makeup of the town was 76.62% White, 22.29% African American, 10.3% Native American, 0.10% from other races, and 0.90% from two or more races. Hispanic or Latino of any race were 0.70% of the population.

There were 406 households, of which 34.5% had children under the age of 18 living with them, 48.0% were married couples living together, 15.8% had a female householder with no husband present, and 34.5% were non-families. 32.3% of all households were made up of individuals, and 17.2% had someone living alone who was 65 years of age or older. The average household size was 2.43 and the average family size was 3.09.

27.2% of the population was under the age of 18, 9.2% from 18 to 24, 27.3% from 25 to 44, 21.8% from 45 to 64, and 14.6% who were 65 years of age or older. The median age was 36 years. For every 100 females, there were 87.9 males. For every 100 females age 18 and over, there were 79.0 males.

The median household income was $25,800 and the median family income was $37,784. Males had a median income of $29,500 versus $16,786 for females. The per capita income for the town was $14,715. About 13.3% of families and 18.0% of the population were below the poverty line, including 20.7% of those under age 18 and 25.4% of those age 65 or over.

== Sports ==
Sumrall High School won baseball 3A State Championships in 2008, 2009, 2010, 2011 and 2015, 4A State Championships in 2022 and 2024, and 5A State Championship in 2026. The 2009 team was undefeated, while the 2010 and the 2022 team lost a single game. They currently hold the state record in Mississippi for the consecutive number of high school baseball games won, with a streak of 67 games won between 2008 and 2010.

== Education ==
The Town of Sumrall is served by the Lamar County School District. Schools in Sumrall are the Sumrall Middle School, Sumrall High School (Home of the Bobcats) as well as the Sumrall Elementary School.

== Notable people ==
- Dawn H. Beam, associate justice of the Supreme Court of Mississippi
- Jake Brown, former Major League Baseball player
- Leonard Caston, blues musician
- Archie Cooley, college football coach
- Joey Fillingane, member of the Mississippi State Senate
- Cary Hudson, lead singer, guitarist and main songwriter of the alternative country/Southern rock band Blue Mountain
- Billy Lott, former running back in the National Football League and American Football League
- Sixty Rayburn, former member of the Louisiana House of Representatives and Louisiana State Senate
- Jordan Thomas, NFL tight end
