= South Central Regional Medical Center =

Hospital in Mississippi, U.S.

Geography
- Location: 1220 Jefferson Street, Laurel, Mississippi, United States
- Coordinates: 31.68516°N 89.14072°W

Organization
- Care system: Public
- Type: Regional

Services
- Emergency department: Level III
- Beds: 285

History
- Founded: 1952

Links
- Website: scrmc.com
- Lists: Hospitals in Mississippi

South Central Regional Medical Center was founded in 1952 and is currently a 285-bed, public not-for-profit hospital located in Laurel, Mississippi. The hospital primarily serves a four-county area: Jones County, Jasper County, Wayne County and Smith County. The stated focus of the South Central Regional Medical Center Health System is to provide excellent healthcare services to the residents of South Central Mississippi and to improve the quality of life in the region.

SCRMC says it has 114 providers representing more than 30 medical specialties, and about 2,300 employees throughout its health system.

In 2013 and 2014, the facility's average length of stay was about 4.6 days and its Medicaid utilization rate was near 70 percent.

== Ratings and recognition ==
The Leapfrog Group, an independent national watchdog organization, consistently gave SCRMC a "C" Safety Grade from the first quarter of 2020 to the last quarter of 2023. As of the first quarter of 2024, the grade dropped to a "D". In the spring of 2026 it dropped to an "F"

In 2021, SCRMC was named a COVID-19 Center of Excellence by the Mississippi State Department of Health, and was certified in 2022 as a Baby-Friendly facility by Baby-Friendly USA.

== Government penalization ==
In 2015, SCRMC settled a case with the Office of Inspector General (OIG) for nearly $319,000 regarding claims for emergency ambulance transportation to destinations such as nursing facilities and patient residences that should have been billed at the lower non-emergency rate.

In 2016, SCRMC was one of three hospitals in Mississippi to have their payments cut all three years that Medicaid had issued penalties for patient injuries.

In January 2022, after it self-disclosed conduct to the OIG, South Central Regional Medical Center (SCRMC), Mississippi, agreed to pay $92,793.81 for allegedly violating the Civil Monetary Penalties Law. The OIG alleged that SCRMC employed an individual that it knew or should have known was excluded from participation in Federal health care programs.
