= Bellevue, Mississippi =

- Unincorporated community
- Location within Mississippi Location within the United States
- Coordinates: 31.309906°N 89.500093°W
- Country: United States
- State: Mississippi
- County: Lamar
- Time zone: UTC-6 (Central (CST))
  - Summer (DST): UTC-5 (CDT)
- Area code: 601

Bellevue, Mississippi is an unincorporated community in Lamar County, Mississippi.

In 2014, a group of Bellevue residents began the unsuccessful process of incorporating the community as a city. Incorporating the city would require approval of two-thirds of the voters in the proposed area. The proposed City of Bellevue would span about 15 sq mi (39 km^{2}), and have an initial population of 5,000 to 10,000. The proposed location of the City of Bellevue would be west of Hattiesburg, and would encompass the subdivisions of Bellegrass, Bent Creek, Bridgefield, Canebrake, Cumberland, Highpoint, and Sandstone, although "there is no official blueprint for the potential city".
