= Talowah, Mississippi =

- Unincorporated community
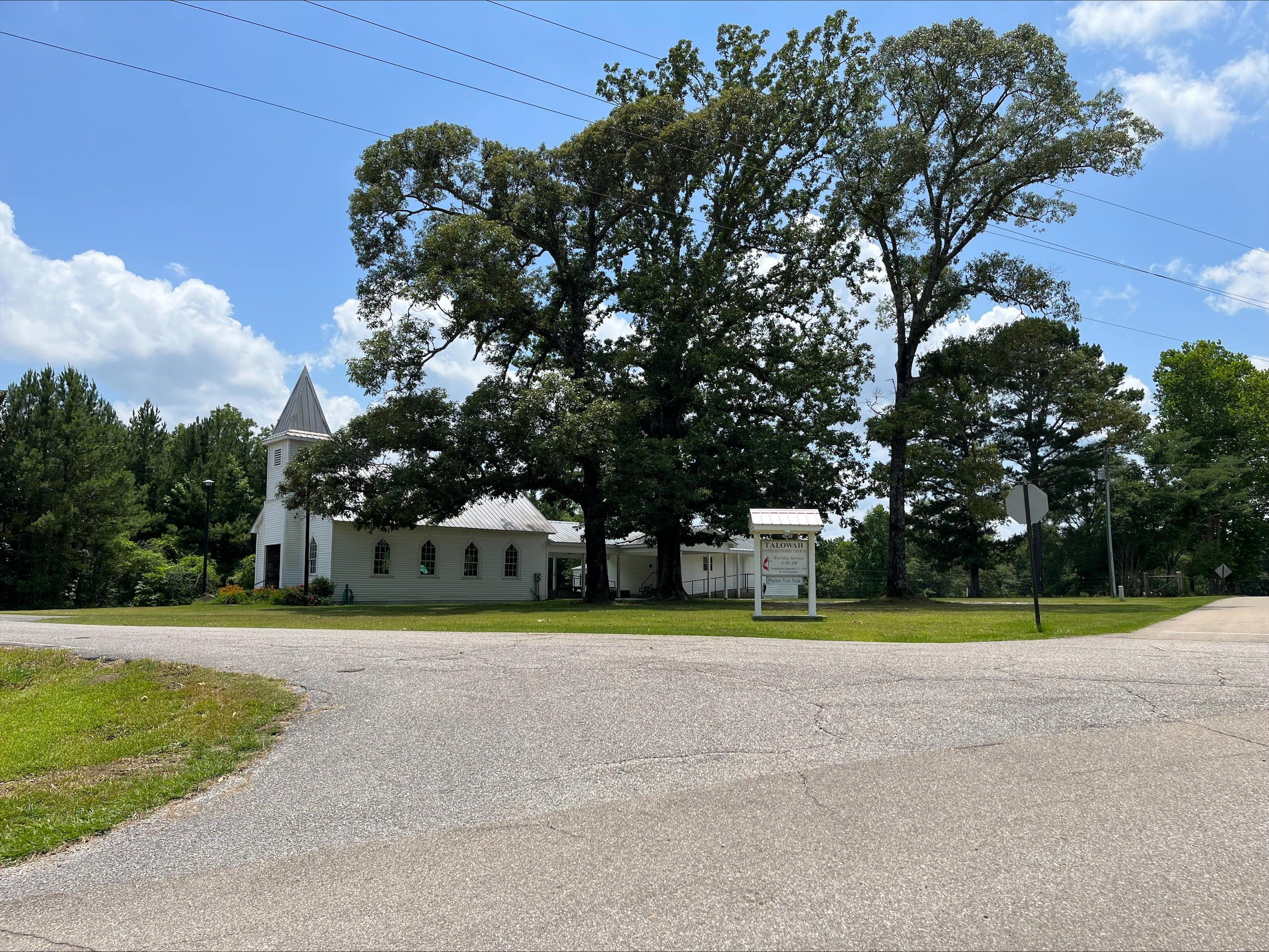
- Talowah United Methodist Church

- Location within Mississippi Location within the United States
- Coordinates: 31°04′34″N 89°25′49″W
- Country: United States
- State: Mississippi
- County: Lamar
- Elevation: 276 ft (84 m)
- Time zone: UTC-6 (Central (CST))
  - Summer (DST): UTC-5 (CDT)
- Area code: 601
- GNIS feature ID: 694935

Talowah is an unincorporated community in Lamar County, in the U.S. state of Mississippi.

== History ==
Talowah is a name derived from the Choctaw language purported to mean "many rocks".

The community is located on the Norfolk Southern Railway. A post office operated under the name Talawah from 1884 to 1891 and under the name Talowah from 1907 to 1912.
