= Mississippi High School 8-3A Division =

Division 8-3A is a high school athletic conference under The Mississippi High School Athletics Association. It comprises teams in the Southeastern Region of the State of Mississippi. Numerous sports are played in this division, including football, baseball, basketball, softball, tennis, and golf. The teams of all MHSAA divisions can be found at the MHSAA web site.

== Sports ==
District 8-3A will consist of the following schools for the 2009-2011 athletic years:

Collins High, Perry Central High, Seminary High, St. Patrick High, Sumrall High, and West Marion High.

=== Baseball ===
Division 8-3A won the Mississippi Class 3A State Championship in 2003 (Greene Co.), 2004 (Purvis), 2005 (Purvis), 2008 (Sumrall) & 2009 (Sumrall).

The following charts show past division winners and season results:

Academic Year	School	Season Result
2001-2002		
2002-2003		
2003-2004	Purvis Tornadoes	Won 3A State Championship vs. Cleveland
2004-2005	Purvis Tornadoes	Won 3A State Championship vs. Senatobia
2005-2006		
2006-2007	Sumrall Bobcats	Lost 3A South State Championship vs. Purvis
2007-2008	Sumrall Bobcats	Won 3A State Championship vs. Mooreville
2008-2009	Sumrall Bobcats	Won 3A State Championship vs. South-Pontotoc

=== Basketball ===
The following charts show past division winners and season results:

Academic Year	School	Season Result
2001-2002		
2002-2003	Richton Rebels	2A State Champions
2003-2004		
2004-2005		
2005-2006		
2006-2007		
2007-2008	Pass Christian Pirates	Lost 3A South State Championship to Columbia

=== Football ===
The following charts show past division winners and season results:

Academic Year	School	Season Result	Final Record
1994-1995	West Marion Trojans	Lost in 3A 2nd Round playoff vs. Franklin Co.	
1995-1996	Poplarville Hornets	Lost in 3A 1st Round playoff vs. Raleigh	
1996-1997	Purvis Tornadoes	Lost 3A 1st Round playoff vs. Prentiss	10-1
1997-1998	Purvis Tornadoes	Lost 3A South State Championship vs. Magee	12-1
1998-1999	Purvis Tornadoes	Lost 3A 2nd Round playoff vs. Magee	10-2
1999-2000	Greene Co. Wildcats	Lost 3A 1st Round playoff vs. Forest	11-1
2000-2001	Tylertown Chiefs	Won 3A 2nd playoff vs. Newton Co.	9-3
2001-2002	West Marion Trojans	Lost 3A 2nd Round playoff vs. Columbia	10-1
2002-2003	Greene Co. Wildcats	Lost 3A 3rd Round vs. Collins	12-1
2003-2004	Tylertown Chiefs	Lost 3A 2nd Round playoff vs. Hazelhurst	11-1
2004-2005	Greene Co. Wildcats	Lost 3A 2nd Round playoff vs. West Lauderdale	7-5
2005-2006	Greene Co. Wildcats	Lost 3A 3rd Round playoff vs. Hazelhurst	9-3
2006-2007	Raleigh Lions	Lost 3A 2nd Round playoff vs. Hazelhurst	10-2
2007-2008	Greene Co. Wildcats	Lost 3A 1st Round playoff vs. Tylertown	7-4
2008-2009	Columbia Wildcats	Lost 3A 3rd Round playoff vs. Franklin Co.	10-3
