= Baptist Memorial Hospital-Golden Triangle =

Coordinates: 33.526°N 88.428°W

- Baptist Memorial Health Care

Geography
- Location: Columbus, Mississippi, United States

Services
- Standards: The Joint Commission
- Emergency department: Level III trauma center
- Beds: 328

Links
- Website: https://www.baptistonline.org/facilities/goldentriangle/ Baptist Memorial Hospital-Golden Triangle
- Lists: Hospitals in Mississippi

Baptist Memorial Hospital-Golden Triangle is a 323-bed acute care hospital in Columbus, Mississippi, and part of Baptist Memorial Health Care. The hospital serves eastern Mississippi and western Alabama and is designated as a Level III trauma center by the Mississippi State Department of Health.

== History ==
The hospital was formerly known as Golden Triangle Regional Medical Center and was owned by Lowndes County, Mississippi. On March 19, 1993, the hospital was leased to Baptist Memorial Health Care System, becoming part of the Baptist Memorial Health Care network.

== Services and facilities ==
The hospital provides emergency care, heart and vascular care, cancer care, bariatric surgery, behavioral health services, maternity care, and wound management.

The hospital maintains secondary pediatric trauma center designation and is accredited by The Joint Commission.

In 2024, Baptist Memorial Hospital-Golden Triangle received the American Heart Association's Get With The Guidelines Stroke Gold Plus quality achievement award for its stroke care program.
