= Jaden Crumedy =

American football player (born 2000)

No. 95 – Houston Texans
- Position: Defensive tackle
- Roster status: Practice squad

Personal information
- Born: July 30, 2000 (age 26); Hattiesburg, Mississippi, U.S.
- Listed height: 6 ft 4 in (1.93 m)
- Listed weight: 301 lb (137 kg)

Career information
- High school: Oak Grove (Hattiesburg)
- College: Mississippi State (2019–2023)
- NFL draft: 2024: 6th round, 200th overall pick

Career history
- Carolina Panthers (2024–2025); Green Bay Packers (2026)*; Houston Texans (2026–present)
- * Offseason or practice squad member only

Career NFL statistics as of 2025
- Total tackles: 15
- Sacks: 0.5
- Stats at Pro Football Reference

Jaden Jermaine Crumedy (born July 30, 2000) is an American professional football defensive tackle for the Houston Texans of the National Football League (NFL). He played college football for the Mississippi State Bulldogs and was selected by the Carolina Panthers in the sixth round of the 2024 NFL draft.

== Early life ==
Crumedy attended high school at Oak Grove High School. Coming out of high school, Crumedy was ranked as a four-star prospect, the number 12 defensive end in the class of 2018, and the number three recruit in Mississippi in 2018. Crumedy decided to commit to play for the Mississippi State Bulldogs.

== College career ==
In Crumedy's freshman season in 2019, he made 18 tackles with two going for a loss. In the 2020 season, Crumedy tallied 32 tackles with three and a half being for a loss, two sacks, and two pass deflections. In a comeback win in the 2021 season versus Louisiana Tech, Crumedy came up with a big blocked kick. Crumedy posted 23 tackles, with two going for a loss, a sack, a pass deflection, and a forced fumble during the 2021 season. In the 2022 season, Crumedy played in just four games due to injury, where he totaled 11 tackles with three and a half being for a loss, and a sack. After the conclusion of the 2022 season, Crumedy would decide to return to Mississippi State as a graduate student. In Crumedy's final season in 2023 he notched 35 tackles with three and a half going for a loss, two and a half sacks, and two pass deflections. After the conclusion of the 2023 season, Crumedy would declare for the 2024 NFL draft.

== Professional career ==
Pre-draft measurables
Height	Weight	Arm length	Hand span	Wingspan	40-yard dash	10-yard split	20-yard split	20-yard shuttle	Three-cone drill	Vertical jump	Broad jump	Bench press
6 ft 3 7/8 in (1.93 m)	301 lb (137 kg)	33 in (0.84 m)	10 1/2 in (0.27 m)	6 ft 5 1/2 in (1.97 m)	4.97 s	1.69 s	2.87 s	4.56 s	7.70 s	30.0 in (0.76 m)	8 ft 9 in (2.67 m)	14 reps
All values from NFL Combine/Pro Day

=== Carolina Panthers ===
Crumedy was selected by the Carolina Panthers in the sixth round (200th overall) of the 2024 NFL draft. He was placed on injured reserve on August 29, 2024. He was activated on November 6.

Crumedy was waived on August 27, 2025, and re-signed to the practice squad. He was promoted to the active roster on September 6. On October 28, Crumedy was waived by the Panthers and re-signed to the practice squad.

=== Green Bay Packers ===
On January 20, 2026, Crumedy signed a reserve/futures contract with the Green Bay Packers On August 30, Crumedy was released by the Packers as a part of final roster cuts. A day later, he was re–signed to the Packers' practice squad.

=== Houston Texans ===
On September 11, 2026, Crumedy was signed by the Houston Texans off of the Packers practice squad. He was waived on November 2 and re-signed to the practice squad.
