= Walter Young (baseball) =

American baseball player (1980-2015)

- First baseman
- Born: February 18, 1980; Hattiesburg, Mississippi, U.S.
- Died: September 19, 2015 (aged 35); Purvis, Mississippi, U.S.
- Batted: Left Threw: Right

MLB debut
- September 6, 2005, for the Baltimore Orioles

Last MLB appearance
- October 2, 2005, for the Baltimore Orioles

MLB statistics
- Batting average: .303
- Home runs: 1
- Runs batted in: 3
- Stats at Baseball Reference

Teams
- Baltimore Orioles (2005)

Walter Earnest Young, Jr. (February 18, 1980 – September 19, 2015) was an American professional baseball player. He played part of one season in Major League Baseball (MLB) for the Baltimore Orioles in 2005 as a first baseman and designated hitter.

He was known for his large size and his ability to hit towering home runs. Young was listed at 6 feet 5 inches (1.96 m) and 322 pounds (146 kg). As of January 2022, his weight was the highest ever recorded by an active Major League Baseball player.

== Baseball career ==
Young was born in Hattiesburg, Mississippi. He played high school baseball at Purvis High School in Purvis, Mississippi. The Pittsburgh Pirates selected him in the 31st round of the 1999 MLB draft. Young turned down a scholarship offer from Louisiana State University to sign with the Pirates.

Young advanced steadily through the system, but before the 2004 season, the Pirates released him. He was claimed on waivers by the Orioles and assigned to their Class AA affiliate, the Bowie Baysox. Young recovered from a slow start in Bowie to hit 33 home runs and appeared in the Eastern League All-Star Game. In 2005, he participated in the Orioles' spring training and started the regular season with the Orioles' Class AAA affiliate, the Ottawa Lynx.

Young was called up to the Orioles on September 1, 2005, after batting .288 with 13 home runs and 81 RBIs at Ottawa. Since 2005 was the last year that he could be optioned to the minors without having to pass through waivers, the Orioles said upon promoting him that they would use him in September to see if he fit into their plans for 2005. Young played 10 games for the Orioles in 2005, finishing with a .303 (10 for 33) batting average, 1 home run, and 3 RBIs. In the offseason, Young played for the Tiburones de La Guaira club of the Venezuelan Winter League.

In January 2006, Young was designated for assignment by the Orioles, after the O's had signed first basemen Russell Branyan and Rafael Palmeiro. Young was then claimed off waivers by the San Diego Padres, but faced much competition for the first base job: although their regular first baseman, Mike Piazza, started the season on the disabled list, Young did not win a spot on the major league roster out of spring training; Adrián González became their starting first baseman instead. Young was sent to the Padres' Class AAA affiliate, the Portland Beavers, where he shared the first-base job. He started the season in a slump; and on April 25, 2006, the Padres released him.

On May 8, the Houston Astros signed Young and assigned him to their Class AA affiliate, the Corpus Christi Hooks, where he spent the rest of the season hitting .277/.309/.410 with 10 home runs and 60 RBI and alongside Hunter Pence lead the team to a Texas League championship.

On March 29, 2007, the independent Winnipeg Goldeyes signed Young. Young spent the full 2007 season with the Goldeyes, batting .313 with 21 home runs and 78 RBIs The Goldeyes exercised Young's 2008 option following the season, but instead he signed with the Sussex Skyhawks. Later in 2008, Young moved to the Sioux City Explorers and helped lead the team to the American Association playoffs, where he hit .367 with 5 home runs and 29 RBIs in 26 games.

In January 2009, Young re-signed with Sioux City and played for the Explorers until the end of June. In July, he signed to play for the Edmonton Capitals of the Golden Baseball League. After about a month there, he was released on August 17. He began playing semi-pro baseball with his hometown Hattiesburg Black Sox in 2010.

== Post-baseball career ==
Young, who had planned to pursue a degree in criminal justice with LSU before signing with the Pirates, joined the Forrest County Sheriff's Department and began working as a shift sergeant at the county jail. As of 2010, he was pursuing a degree from the online University of Phoenix.

Young died on September 19, 2015, of a heart attack. He weighed 450 pounds (200 kg) at the time of his death.
