= Okahola, Mississippi =

- Unincorporated community
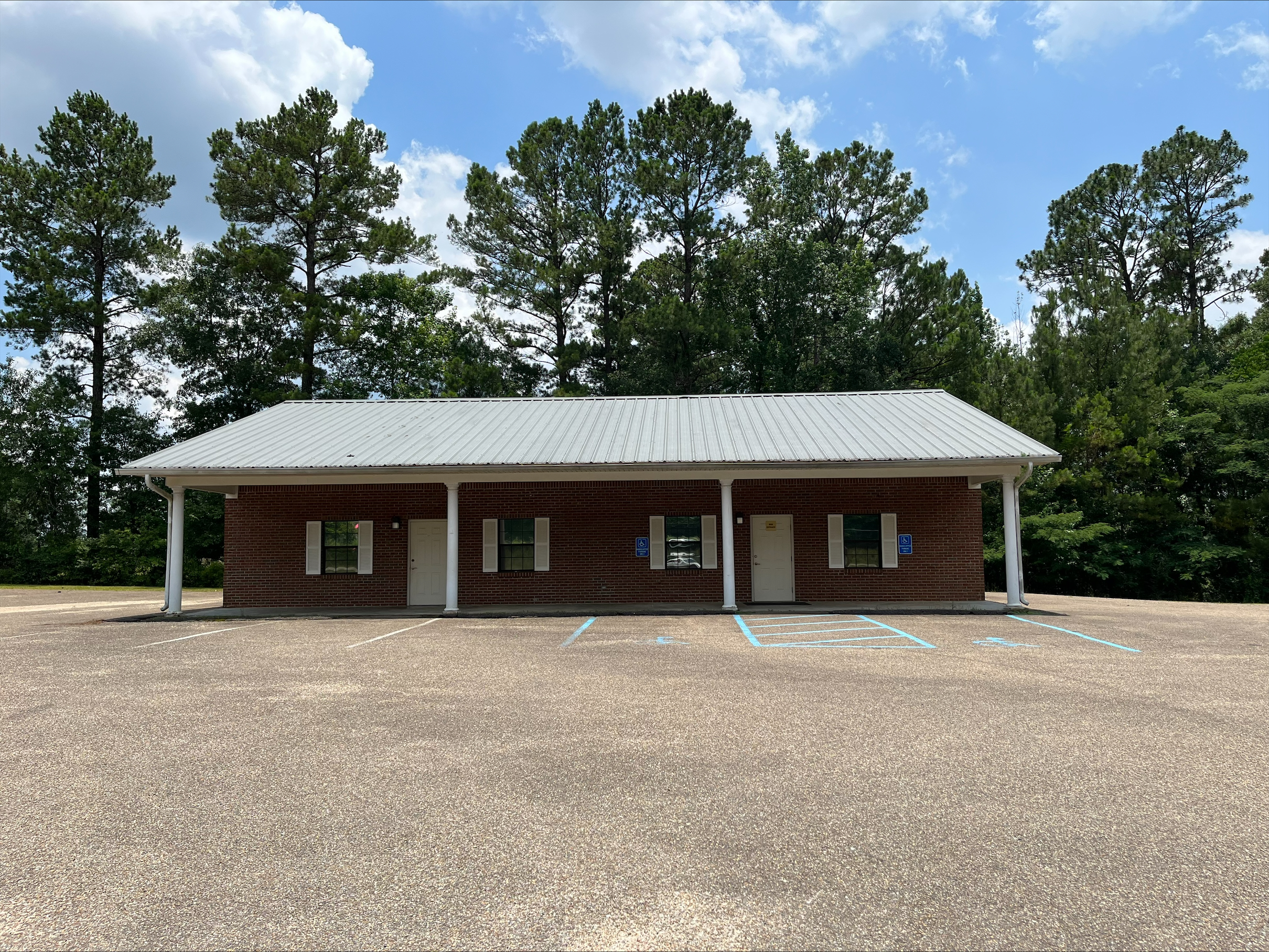
- Okahola Community Center

- Location within Mississippi Location within the United States
- Coordinates: 31°12′25″N 89°23′11″W
- Country: United States
- State: Mississippi
- County: Lamar
- Elevation: 240 ft (73 m)
- Time zone: UTC-6 (Central (CST))
  - Summer (DST): UTC-5 (CDT)
- Area code: 601
- GNIS feature ID: 692123

Okahola is an unincorporated community in Lamar County, in the U.S. state of Mississippi.

== History ==
Ofahoma is a name derived from the Choctaw language, purported to mean either (sources vary) "scarce water" or "sounding water".

The community is located on the Norfolk Southern Railway. Okahola is served by a community center that also doubles as a voting precinct.
