= Eric Booth Jr. =

American baseball player (born 2008)

Baltimore Orioles
- Outfielder
- Born: July 4, 2008 (age 18); Bassfield, Mississippi, U.S.
- Bats: Left Throws: Left

Eric Booth Jr. (born July 4, 2008) is an American professional baseball outfielder in the Baltimore Orioles organization.

== Career ==
Booth Jr. attends Oak Grove High School in Hattiesburg, Mississippi. As a junior in 2025, he hit .467 with six home runs and 27 stolen bases. In July 2025, he won the home run derby at the Perfect Game All-American Classic. He was committed to play college baseball at Vanderbilt University.

Booth Jr. was considered one of the top prospects for the 2026 Major League Baseball draft. He was drafted 7th overall in the draft by the Baltimore Orioles. He signed with the Orioles for a signing bonus of approximately $7.34 million.

== Personal life ==
His father, Eric Booth, was selected by the Toronto Blue Jays in the 34th round of the 1993 MLB draft and played college football for the Southern Miss Golden Eagles.
