= Baptist Anderson Regional Medical Center =

Hospital in Mississippi, U.S.

- Baptist Memorial Health Care

Geography
- Location: 2124 14th St, Meridian, Mississippi, United States
- Coordinates: 32.37152°N 88.69936°W

Organization
- Care system: Public
- Type: Regional

Services
- Emergency department: Level III
- Beds: 260

Helipads
- Helipad: Yes

History
- Founded: 1929

Links
- Website: www.baptistonline.org/locations/anderson
- Lists: Hospitals in Mississippi

Baptist Anderson Regional Medical Center is a 260-bed short-term acute care hospital in Meridian, Mississippi. It is part of Baptist Memorial Health Care and operates as a Level III trauma center and Level III pediatric trauma center.

== History ==
In 1929, Dr. Jeff Anderson purchased the 30-bed Turner Hospital in Meridian and renamed it Anderson Infirmary. During the Great Depression, Dr. Anderson mortgaged his private home to keep the hospital open. When the hospital expanded to 120 beds it was renamed Jeff Anderson Memorial Hospital, then renamed Jeff Anderson Regional Medical Center in 1975.

In 2019, the Baptist Anderson Regional Cancer Center became the first center in the United States to treat cancer using RaySearch Laboratories treatment planning system and Accuray Incorporated's Tomotherapy treatment delivery system concurrently.

On October 18, 2023, Anderson Regional Medical Center announced that it would merge with Memphis, Tennessee-based Baptist Memorial Health Care. The merger was finalized in January 2024, and Anderson Regional Medical Center became Baptist Anderson Regional Medical Center.

== Services and facilities ==
Baptist Anderson Regional Medical Center functions as a short-term acute care hospital with 260 beds. The hospital is accredited by The Joint Commission and operates as a Level III trauma center and Level III pediatric trauma center.

The hospital provides inpatient, outpatient, emergency, diagnostic imaging, surgical, maternity, cancer, cardiac, rehabilitation, and specialty care services. Its facilities and outpatient services include a health and fitness center, sleep disorders center, outpatient pharmacy, diagnostic imaging services, express care clinic, pain management clinic, and multiple specialty clinics.

Baptist Anderson also includes outpatient and specialty locations in Meridian, including Baptist Healthplex-Anderson, Baptist Anderson Children's Medical Center, Baptist Anderson Digestive Health Center, and Baptist Anderson Rheumatology Center.

Baptist Anderson was first designated as a Baby-Friendly facility in 2019 and was re-designated in 2025.

== Education and affiliations ==
Baptist Anderson Regional Medical Center is affiliated with the University of Mississippi Medical Center, giving the hospital access to medical subspecialties, including pediatric subspecialties, that are not available in Meridian.

== Baptist Anderson Regional Medical Center-South ==
In 2010, Anderson Regional Health System purchased Riley Memorial Hospital in Meridian and renamed the facility Anderson Regional Medical Center-South. Riley Hospital was a 140-bed facility, and the acquisition allowed Anderson to expand inpatient rehabilitation and long-term acute care services. The facility is now known as Baptist Anderson Regional Medical Center-South.

Riley Hospital was founded in 1930 by Dr. Franklin Riley. Dr. Riley was a World War I veteran and native of Tupelo who completed his residency at the University of Pennsylvania. He became Meridian's first residency-trained pediatrician in 1922 and was one of the founding members of the American Board of Pediatrics and the American Academy of Pediatrics. In 1930 Dr. Riley opened a 12-bed women's and children's hospital in Meridian, which was the first of its kind in Mississippi. The hospital continued to expand over the years and was converted to a nonprofit facility. Dr. Riley's sons, William and Richard Riley, both completed medical school at Vanderbilt University School of Medicine and returned to Meridian to work with their father. In 1998, the hospital was sold to Health Management Associates.
