= Purvis High School =

Location
- 220 School Street, Purvis, MS 39475; United States; 31°8′19″N 89°24′25″W

Information
- Principal: Julie Clinton
- Staff: 46.98 (FTE)
- Grades: 9–12
- Gender: Coeducational
- Enrollment: 623 (2023–2024)
- Student to teacher ratio: 13.26
- Campus type: Purple, gold, and black
- Team name: Tornadoes
- Website: phs.lamarcountyschools.org

Purvis High School is a school within the Lamar County School District. It is located at 220 School St., Purvis, Mississippi.

The principal is Julie Clinton. The school colors are purple and gold. The school mascot is a tornado, named after the deadly tornado that struck on April 24, 1908.

== Statistics ==
For the 2020–2021 school year, the school had 605 students enrolled and about 42 teachers employed.

== Athletics ==
Purvis High School is home to the Purvis Tornadoes. The school has football, basketball, baseball, soccer, golf, tennis, softball, track & field, and swimming teams.

=== Baseball ===
State Champions	South State Champions/State Runner-up	Division champions

Academic Year	Class	Coach	Final Record	Season Results
2000-2001	8-3A	Tony Farlow	14-11	Lost 1st round playoff (West Lauderdale) 0-2
2001-2002	8-3A	Tony Farlow	29-9	Won 1st round playoff (North Pike) 2-0; Won 2nd round playoff (Morton) 2-0; Won 3A South State Championship (Greene Co.) 2-1; Lost 3A State Championship (Senatobia) 0-2
2002-2003	8-3A	Tony Farlow	24-9	Won 1st round playoff (Morton) 2-1; Won 2nd round playoff (Philadelphia) 2-0; Lost 3A South State Championship (Greene Co.) 1-2
2003-2004	8-3A	Tony Farlow	32-6	Won 1st round Double Elimination Tournament (Carthage, Morton, West Marion) 3-1; Won 2nd round playoff (Raleigh) 2-0; Won 3A South State Championship (West Lauderdale) 2-1; Won 3A State Championship (Cleveland) 2-1; Ranked #1 in the Clarion Ledger final season poll.
2004-2005	8-3A	Tony Farlow	24-11	Won 1st round Double Elimination Tournament (Columbia, Franklin Co., Hazelhurst) 3-0; Won 2nd round playoff (Morton) 2-0; Won 3A South State Championship (West Lauderdale) 2-1; Won 3A State Championship (Senatobia) 2-0
2005-2006	8-3A	Tony Farlow	10-12	Missed playoffs
2006-2007	8-3A	Tony Farlow	21-13	Won 1st round playoff (South East Lauderdale) 2-0; Won 2nd round playoff (Richland) 2-0; Won 3A South State Championship (Sumrall) 2-1; Lost 3A State Championship (Nettleton) 1-2
2007-2008	8-3A	Tony Farlow	17-10	Won 3A 1st round playoff (Jefferson Co.) 2-0; Lost 3A 2nd round playoff (Newton Co.) 0-2
2008-2009	8-3A	Tony Farlow	23-8	Won 3A 1st round playoff (Magee) 2-0; Won 3A 2nd round playoff (Newton Co.) 2-1; Won 3A 3rd round playoff (Perry Central) 2-0; Lost 3A South State Championship (Sumrall) 0-2
2009-2010	8-4A	Tony Farlow	17-10	Lost 4A 1st round playoff (West Lauderdale) 1-2
2010-2011	8-4A	Tony Farlow	20-8	Bye 4A 1st round playoff (Received bye for winning district championship); Won 4A 2nd round playoff (Lawrence Co.) 2-0; Won 4A 3rd round playoff (Magee) 2-1; Lost 4A South State Championship (Columbia) 0-2
2011-2012	7-4A	Tony Farlow	26-5	Bye 4A 1st round playoff (Received bye for winning district championship); Won 4A 2nd round playoff (Newton Co.) 2-0; Won 4A 3rd round playoff (Richland) 2-0; Won 4A South State Championship (West Lauderdale) 2-0; Won 4A State Championship (Lewisburg) 2-1 #1 in state and #5 in nation in team ERA.
2012-2013	7-4A	Tony Farlow	15-12	Bye 4A 1st round playoff (Received bye for winning district championship); Lost 4A 2nd round playoff (Germantown) 0-2
2013-2014	7-4A	Tony Farlow	27-10	Won 4A 1st round playoff (Quitman) 2-0; Won 4A 2nd round playoff (St. Stanislaus) 2-0; Won 4A 3rd round playoff (Richland) 2-0; Won 4A South State Championship (Columbia) 2-0; Lost 4A State Championship (West Lauderdale) 0-2
14 seasons			299-134; 69%	13 playoff appearances 41 playoff rounds played (65-26); 5 District Championships('02, '05, '11, '12, '13); 6 South State Championships ('02, '04, '05, '07, '12, '14); 3 State Championships ('04, '05, '12)

Purvis Tornado Baseball Players at the next level

Name	Grad Year	College	College / Pro	Comments
Kenny Rayborn	1993		Seattle Mariners	67th Rd Pick Rangers
Walter Young	1999		Pittsburgh Pirates	31st Rd Pick Pirates, MLB debut with Orioles 9/6/2005

(*) The records, opponents, and season results have been verified using microfilm of past issues of the Hattiesburg American located in Cook Library on the campus of the University of Southern Mississippi.

=== Football ===
The team plays in Cowart Stadium, named for past football coach Don Cowart. Below is a chart depicting the Tornadoes' history, followed by a synopsis of selected seasons. (Team in parentheses is opponent).

Playoff Appearance	Division champions	Winning Season	Coach's Totals

Year	Class	Coach	Season	Final	PF	PA	Season Results
1941-1942		Don Cowart	8-0	11-0	325	19	Won 1st round playoff (Mt. Olive); Won 2nd round playoff (Lumberton); Won 3rd Round playoff (FCAHS); Unscored upon during regular season
		Don Cowart					
1964-1965	Desoto	?	4-4-2	4-4-2	132	110	
1974-1975	Apache	Jack Craft					
1975-1976	Apache	Jack Craft	8-2	8-3	232	78	Lost Apache Championship (TBD)
1976-1977	Apache	Jack Craft					
1977-1978	Apache	Jack Craft					
1978-1979	Apache	Jack Craft	7-1-1	8-1-1			Won Apache Championship (West Marion)
1979-1980	Apache	Jack Craft	5-4	5-4	156	109	
1980-1981	Apache	Jack Craft	6-3	6-3-1	140	124	Tied Apache Championship (Poplarville)
Mississippi High School Athletic Association Reorganization (Changed to Championship Format)
1981-1982	8-A North	Jack Craft	2-7 (1-2)	2-7			
1982-1983	8-A North	Jack Craft	5-4 (4-2)	5-4			
1983-1984	8-A North	Jack Craft	4-6 (2-2)	4-6			
1984-1985	8-3A North	Jack Craft	4-6 (2-2)	4-6			
1985-1986	8-3A North	Jack Craft	9-1 (4-0)	9-2			Lost 8-3A Division Championship (Bay High)
1986-1987	8-3A North	Jack Craft	5-5 (3-1)	5-5	154	184	
1987-1988	15-3A	Jack Craft	5-4 (1-3)	5-4			
1988-1989	15-3A	Jack Craft	1-8 (1-3)	1-8			
1989-1990	15-3A	Jack Craft	5-5 (3-2)	5-5			
		Jack Craft					
1990-1991	15-3A	Robert Walker	3-7 (2-3)	3-7			
1991-1992	8-3A	Robert Walker	1-9 (1-5)	1-9			
1992-1993	8-3A	Robert Walker	1-9 (1-5)	1-9			
3 seasons		Robert Walker	5-25	5-25			16.67% overall win percentage
1993-1994	8-3A	Jim Sizemore	4-7 (3-3)	4-7	148	185	
1994-1995	8-3A	Jim Sizemore	4-6 (2-4)	4-6	148	205	
1995-1996	8-3A	Jim Sizemore	9-2 (4-1)	9-3	236	125	Lost 3A 1st round playoff (Forest)
1996-1997	8-3A	Jim Sizemore	10-0 (5-0)	10-1	267	49	Lost 3A 1st round playoff (Prentiss)
1997-1998	8-3A	Jim Sizemore	10-0 (5-0)	12-1	397	125	Won 3A 1st round playoff (Amite Co.); Won 3A 2nd round playoff (Forest); Lost 3A South State Championship (Magee)
1998-1999	8-3A	Jim Sizemore	9-1 (5-0)	10-2	303	70	Won 3A 1st round playoff (Velma Jackson); Lost 3A second round playoff (Magee)
6 seasons		Jim Sizemore	46-16	49-20	1,499	759	71.01% overall win percentage
1999-2000	8-3A	Ken Chandler	2-8 (0-6)	2-8	135	225	
2000-2001	8-3A	Ken Chandler	1-10 (0-6)	1-10	76	245	
2001-2002	8-3A	Ken Chandler	2-8 (1-5)	2-8	155	195	
3 seasons		Ken Chandler	5-26	5-26	366	665	16.13% overall win percentage
2002-2003	8-3A	Wayne Carr	3-7 (1-5)	3-7	130	175	
2003-2004	8-3A	Wayne Carr	5-5 (4-2)	5-6	205	196	Lost 3A 1st round playoff (West Lauderdale)
2004-2005	8-3A	Wayne Carr	3-7 (2-4)	3-7	170	323	
2005-2006	8-3A	Wayne Carr	2-6 (1-5)	2-6	95	194	
4 seasons		Wayne Carr	13-25	13-26	600	888	33.33% overall win percentage
2006-2007	8-3A	Perry Wheat	2-8 (0-6)	2-8	123	281	
2007-2008	8-3A	Perry Wheat	5-5 (3-3)	6-6	300	337	Won 3A 1st round playoff (South Pike); Lost 3A 2nd round playoff (Raleigh)
2008-2009	8-3A	Perry Wheat	7-3 (4-2)	7-4	311	203	Lost 3A 1st round playoff (Hazelhurst)
2009-2010	8-4A	Perry Wheat	6-4 (4-2)	6-5	280	260	Lost 4A 1st round playoff (Laurel)
2010-2011	8-4A	Perry Wheat	9-1 (5-1)	10-2	413	187	Won 4A 1st round playoff (South Pike); Lost 4A 2nd round playoff (Mendenhall)
2011-2012	7-4A	Perry Wheat	7-3 (4-1)	7-4	271	227	Lost 4A 1st round playoff (Quitman)
2012-2013	7-4A	Perry Wheat	8-2 (4-1)	9-4	424	245	Won 4A 1st round playoff (Poplarville); Lost 4A 2nd round playoff (Quitman)
2013-2014	7-4A	Perry Wheat	9-3 (4-1)	9-3	411	231	Won 4A 1st round playoff (Lawrence County); Won 4A 2nd round playoff (Poplarville); Lost 4A 3rd round playoff (Quitman)
2014-2015	7-4A	Perry Wheat	11-3 (4-1)	11-3	528	391	Won 4A 1st round playoff (Newton County); Won 4A 2nd round playoff (Vancleave); Won 4A 3rd round playoff (Poplarville); Lost 4A 4th round playoff (St. Stainislaus)
8 seasons		Perry Wheat	55-29	47-33	2,122	1,740	65.47% overall win percentage
43 seasons		8 coaches					18 playoff appearances 6 Division Titles; 19 winning seasons

2005-2006 Season shortened by Hurricane Katrina.

== Arts ==
Pride of Purvis Band

The band, currently under direction of Nicole Allen, has achieved many honors.

Theatre

Advanced to State Competition

Under the former direction of Parker McMullan, the Purvis High School Theatre Department has prevailed in many competitions across the state. Every year, Purvis High School attends the Southwest Drama Festival hosted at the University of Southern Mississippi. They have received over thirteen All-Star cast medals, a distinguished play award advancing them to the Mississippi Theatre Association Festival, and an Outstanding Leadership Award. Purvis also participates at the Mississippi Theatre Association Festival. At MTA, Purvis has placed in the design competitions for the past four years, received several all-star cast medals, and have won awards in the 10 Minute Play Competition. At the end of the 2006-2007 school year, Purvis was selected to attend the 2008 American High School Theatre Festival in Edinburgh, Scotland. In early August 2008, Purvis traveled to Scotland and performed. Mrs. Parker McMullan stepped down as director at the end of the 2008-2009 school year. The Purvis High School Theatre Department is currently under the direction of Ms. Dana Coghlan and is in a process of "reorganization".

Academic Year	Director	Honors and Awards
2003-2004	Parker McMullan	Southwest Drama Festival All Star Cast – Wesley Guthrie, Mississippi Theatre Association Acting Award in 10 Minute Play Competition – Casey Keith
2004-2005	Parker McMullan	Tennessee Williams Festival Honorable Mention in Scene Competition – Katie Johnson, Brandy Edick, Nathan Anderson, Southwest Drama Festival All Star Cast - Sassy Scheurich, Mississippi Theatre Association Best Writer in 10 Minute Play Competition – Matt Clark, ITS Festival All Superior Costume Design - Grant Stephens
2005-2006	Parker McMullan	Southwest Drama Festival All Star Cast – Nathan Anderson, Kristi Masters, Melissa Barber, Ryan Siccone, Brandy Edick, Heather Miller, Tish Holden, Mississippi Theatre Association Best Writer in 10 Minute Play Competition and Overall Best Production – Zac Evans, 2nd Place Costume Design – Grant Stephens, 2nd Place Publicity Design – Kristi Masters, ITS Festival All Superior Costume Design – Grant Stephens
2006-2007	Parker McMullan	Southwest Drama Festival Distinguished Play Award – Advancement to State Competition, (A.D. Brandy Edick/ T.D. Nicole Neal) All Star Cast – Nathan Anderson, Mississippi Theatre Association All Star Cast – Brandy Edick, Carrie Stanford, Kayleigh Webb, 1st Place Publicity Design – Nathan Anderson, 3rd Place Costume Design – Grant Stephens, American High School Theatre Festival chose The PHS Theatre Department to perform within an international forum. (Edinburgh, Scotland)
2007-2008	Parker McMullan	Southwest Drama Festival All Star Cast – Nathan Anderson, Mississippi Theatre Association Theatre for Youth All Star Cast – Nathan Anderson, Britni Ferguson, 1st Place Costume Design – Nathan Anderson, 3rd Place Publicity Design – Nathan Anderson, 3rd Place Scenic Design – Hannah Berman, Best Director in a Ten Minute Play - Kirstin Taylor
2008-2009	Parker McMullan	Southwest Drama Festival All Star Cast – Kirstin Taylor, Kayleigh Webb, Outstanding Leadership Award - Kirstin Taylor, Mississippi Theatre Association Best Director and Best Ensemble in 10 Minute Play Competition - Kirstin Taylor, All-Star Cast in 10 Minute Play Competition - Adam Rouse, 2nd Place Costume Design - Kayleigh Webb, 1st Place Publicity Design - Terry Smith
2009-2010	Dana Coghlan	Southwest Drama Festival All Star Cast – Shaun DeRusha
2010-2011	Dana Coghlan	Southwest Drama Festival All Star Cast – Haley Ford
