= Arnold Line, Mississippi =

- Census-designated place
- Location within Mississippi Location within the United States
- Coordinates: 31°20′07″N 89°22′24″W
- Country: United States
- State: Mississippi
- County: Lamar

Area
  - Total: 1.66 sq mi (4.31 km^{2})
  - Land: 1.66 sq mi (4.31 km^{2})
  - Water: 0 sq mi (0.00 km^{2})
- Elevation: 213 ft (65 m)

Population (2020)
  - Total: 2,333
  - Density: 1,403/sq mi (541.7/km^{2})
- Time zone: UTC-6 (Central (CST))
  - Summer (DST): UTC-5 (CDT)
- ZIP code: 39401
- Area code: 601
- GNIS feature ID: 666381
- FIPS code: 28-02060

Arnold Line is an unincorporated area and census-designated place (CDP) in Lamar County, Mississippi, United States. As of the 2020 census it had a population of 2,333. It is part of the Hattiesburg Metropolitan Statistical Area.

It is in the northeast part of Lamar County and is bordered to the north, east, and south by the city of Hattiesburg. The center of Hattiesburg is 5 miles (8 km) to the east in Forrest County. West Hattiesburg is 1 mile (1.6 km) to the south of Arnold Line.

== Demographics ==
Historical population
Census	Pop.	Note	%±
2010	1,719		—
2020	2,333		35.7%
U.S. Decennial Census; 2010 2020

Arnold Line first appeared as a census designated place in the 2010 U.S. census.

=== Racial and ethnic composition ===
Arnold Line CDP, Mississippi – Racial and ethnic composition Note: the US Census treats Hispanic/Latino as an ethnic category. This table excludes Latinos from the racial categories and assigns them to a separate category. Hispanics/Latinos may be of any race.
Race / Ethnicity (NH = Non-Hispanic)	Pop 2010	Pop 2020	% 2010	% 2020
White alone (NH)	966	955	56.20%	40.93%
Black or African American alone (NH)	670	1,118	38.98%	47.92%
Native American or Alaska Native alone (NH)	1	2	0.06%	0.09%
Asian alone (NH)	32	53	1.86%	2.27%
Native Hawaiian or Pacific Islander alone (NH)	2	0	0.12%	0.00%
Other race alone (NH)	2	16	0.12%	0.69%
Mixed race or Multiracial (NH)	12	78	0.70%	3.34%
Hispanic or Latino (any race)	34	111	1.98%	4.76%
Total	1,719	2,333	100.00%	100.00%

=== 2020 census ===
As of the 2020 census, Arnold Line had a population of 2,333. The median age was 31.1 years. 29.0% of residents were under the age of 18 and 10.0% of residents were 65 years of age or older. For every 100 females there were 86.3 males, and for every 100 females age 18 and over there were 84.5 males age 18 and over.

100.0% of residents lived in urban areas, while 0.0% lived in rural areas.

There were 891 households in Arnold Line, of which 39.6% had children under the age of 18 living in them. Of all households, 34.7% were married-couple households, 17.1% were households with a male householder and no spouse or partner present, and 38.7% were households with a female householder and no spouse or partner present. About 26.0% of all households were made up of individuals and 8.1% had someone living alone who was 65 years of age or older.

There were 973 housing units, of which 8.4% were vacant. The homeowner vacancy rate was 0.8% and the rental vacancy rate was 5.6%.

== Education ==
It is in the Lamar County School District.
