= Oak Grove High School (Mississippi) =

Secondary school in Hattiesburg, Mississippi, United States

Location
- 5198 Old Highway 11; Hattiesburg, (Lamar County), Mississippi 39402; United States; 31.305054°N 89.404715°W

Information
- School type: Secondary school
- Motto: OG U Know!
- School district: Lamar County School District
- Principal: Brandi K. Twillie
- Teaching staff: 116.63 (on an FTE basis)
- Grades: 9th to 12th
- Enrollment: 1,772 (2023–2024)
- Student to teacher ratio: 15.19
- Colors: Black and gold
- Mascot: Warrior
- Rival: Petal High School
- Website: "OGHS Website". Lamar County Schools.

Oak Grove High School (OGHS) is a 7A secondary school located near Hattiesburg, Mississippi, United States, in the Oak Grove community (though not within the census-designated place of the same name).The school serves students in grades 9–12 as part of the Lamar County School District. As of the 2025–2026 academic year, the principal is Brandi K. Twillie.

== Awards and recognition ==
Oak Grove is a three-time National Blue Ribbon School, having been designated as such in 1986–1987, 1992–1993, and 2004.

Oak Grove High School is the 2019 recipient of the National Performing Arts School Excellence Award.

== Extracurricular activities ==
In 2008, the school's drama department represented Mississippi at SETC (South Eastern Theatre Conference) for the fifth time. The department won awards in the categories of "Best Technical", "Best Ensemble", and "Most Congenial." Oak Grove High School was only the third school in Mississippi to win the competition since SETC's conception in 1949.

The OGHS Golden Spirits dance team have won 19 MHSAA state titles (jazz, kick, and pom divisions), and are the reigning state champion in jazz for the seventh consecutive year.

The OGHS Varsity Cheerleaders have won 15 MHSAA state titles (1982, 1997, 1998, 1999, 2000, 2001, 2003, 2009, 2010, 2014, 2015, 2017, 2019, 2020, 2023). They are six-time National Champions (1998, 1999, 2022, 2024, 2025 and 2026).

== Athletics ==
=== Football ===
Oak Grove High School's football team gained prominence while former National Football League quarterback Brett Favre was the offensive coordinator for the team in 2012 and 2013. Oak Grove defeated the Sumrall Bobcats 64-6 in Favre's first game as a coach.

On December 6, 2013, the Oak Grove Warriors played their first 6A State Championship game since 2009 against the Tupelo Golden Wave, and won their first state championship.

On December 4, 2020, the Oak Grove Warriors won against the Oxford Chargers in the 6A State Championship game. The final score was 29-28.

On December 3, 2023, the Oak Grove Warriors defeated the Starkville Yellowjackets in the first ever 7A State Championship game. The final score was 33-28.

== Notable alumni ==
- McKale Boley, college football offensive tackle for the Virginia Cavaliers
- Eric Booth Jr., American baseball player for the Baltimore Orioles
- Jaden Crumedy, NFL defensive tackle for the Carolina Panthers
- John Rhys Plumlee, NFL quarterback for the Seattle Seahawks
- PJ Woodland, college football cornerback for the LSU Tigers
