= North Mississippi State Hospital =

Coordinates: 34.237436°N 88.671633°W

- Mississippi Department of Mental Health

Geography
- Location: Tupelo, Mississippi, United States

Organization
- Type: psychiatric hospital

Services
- Beds: 50

History
- Opened: April 1999

Links
- Website: www.nmsh.state.ms.us
- Lists: Hospitals in Mississippi

North Mississippi State Hospital (NMSH) is a 50-bed acute care mental hospital of the Mississippi Department of Mental Health located in Tupelo, Mississippi.

In 1995 the Mississippi State Legislature passed House Bill 960, authorizing the construction of NMSH. The groundbreaking ceremony occurred on Thursday, December 19, 1996. The hospital opened in April 1999. NMSH was the first state-operated psychiatric facility to open in over 100 years prior to 1996.

The hospital, with about 100 employees, is a regional facility. NMSH serves Alcorn, Benton, Calhoun, Chickasaw, Desoto, Itawamba, Lafayette, Lee, Marshall, Monroe, Panola, Prentiss, Pontotoc, Tate, Tippah, Tishomingo, and Yalobusha counties.
