= Southern Decadence =

Annual LGBT event in New Orleans, Louisiana

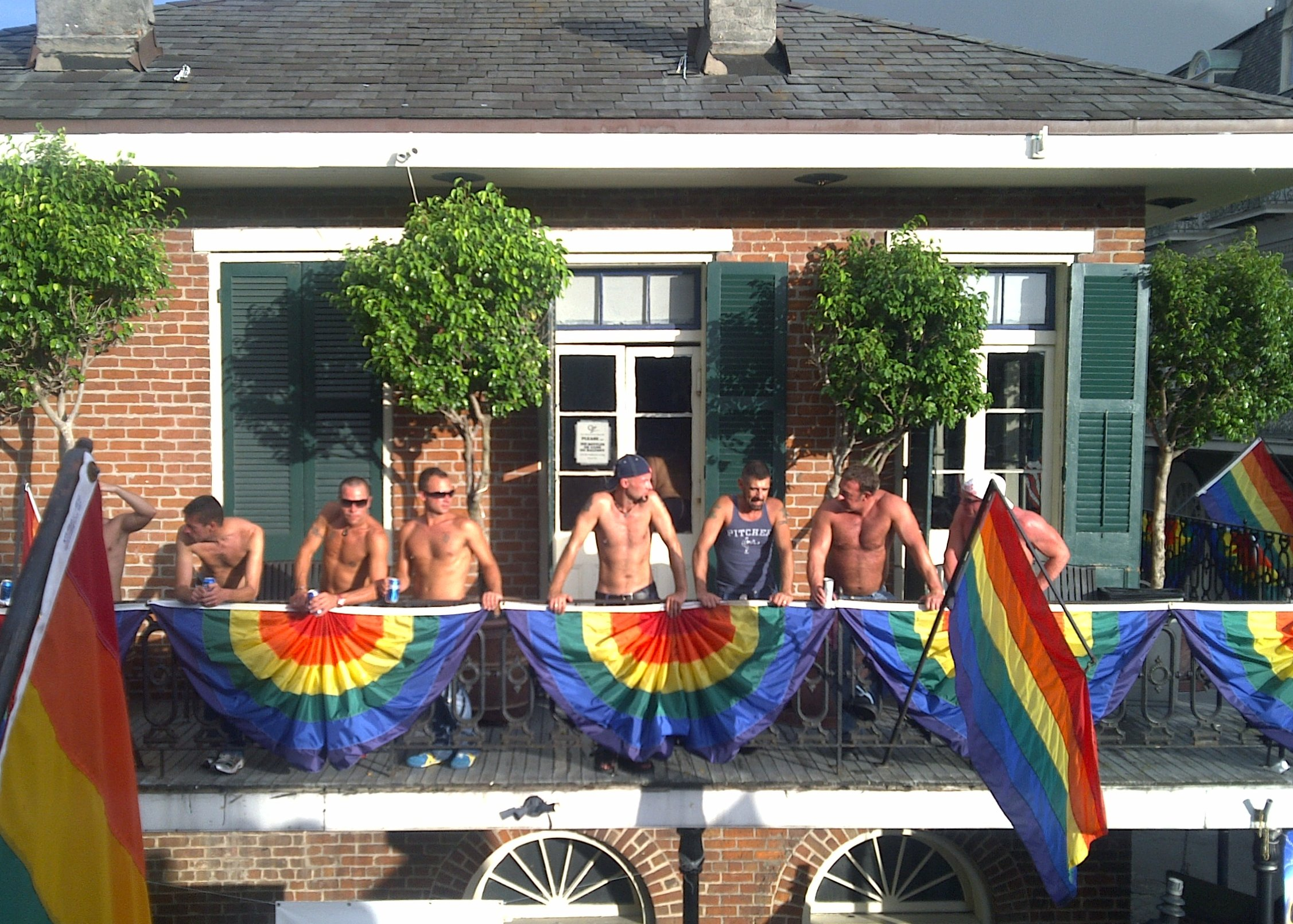
- Shirtless men on a Bourbon Street 'gallery' during Southern Decadence
- Genre: LGBTQ music
- Frequency: Annual, during Labor Day weekend
- Locations: New Orleans, Louisiana, United States
- Years active: 54
- Inaugurated: 1972
- Attendance: >250,000
- Website: none

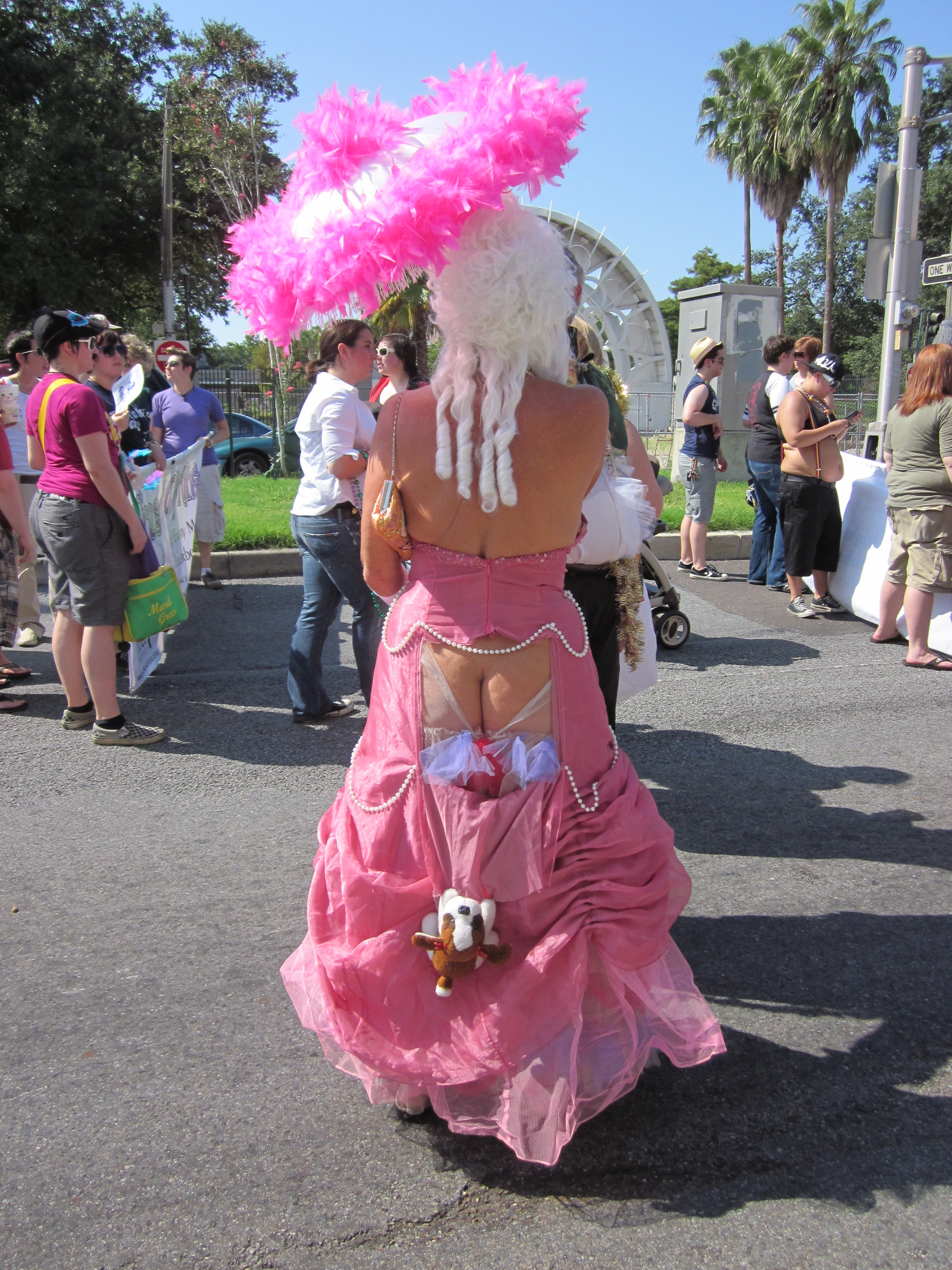
A risqué Decadence costume

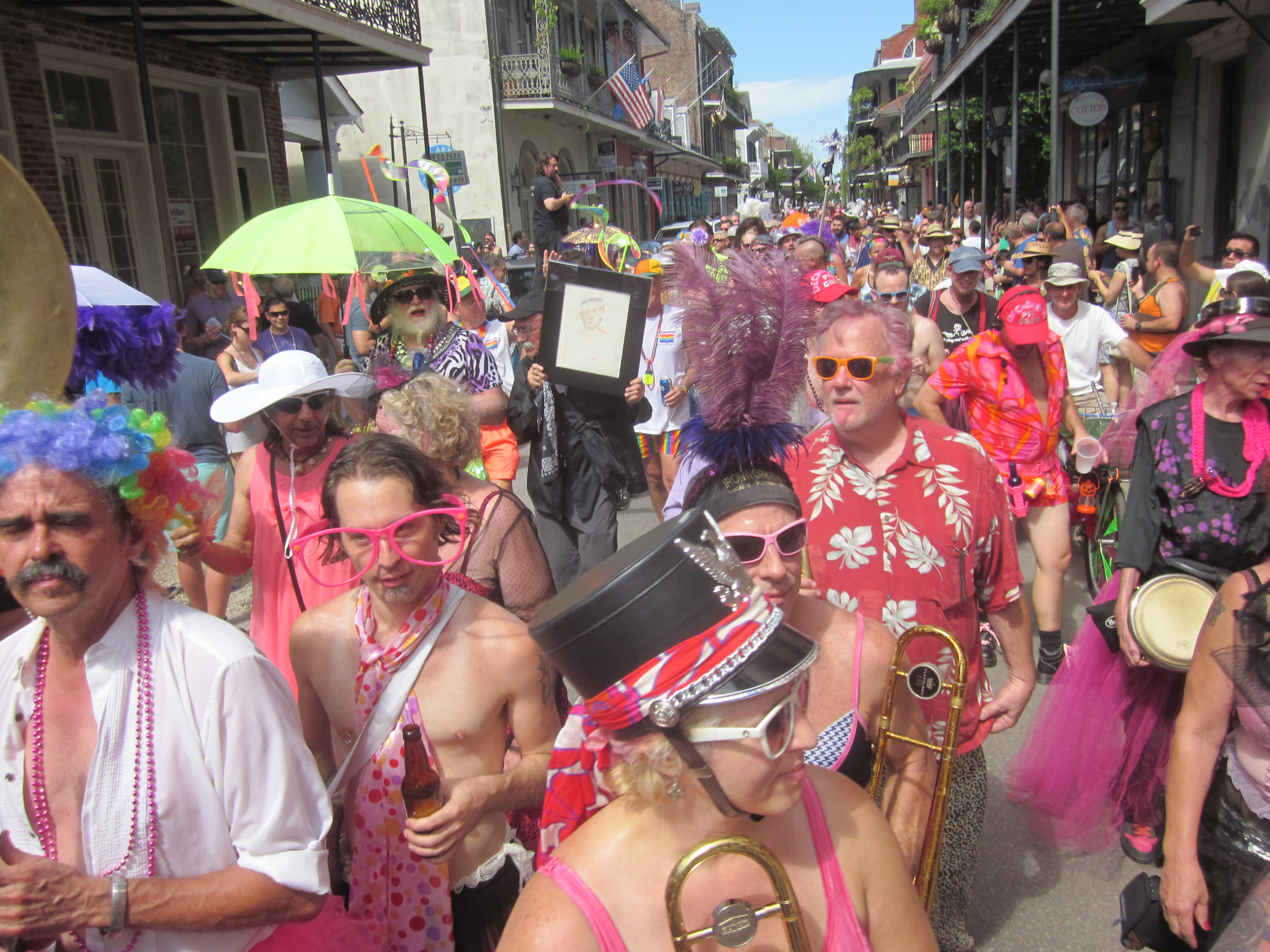
Decadence participants parading down Royal Street

Southern Decadence is an annual, five-day LGBTQ-based event held in New Orleans, Louisiana, United States during Labor Day weekend. It is held from Thursday to Monday, culminating in a parade through the French Quarter on the Sunday before Labor Day.

== History ==
The event traces its beginnings to August 1972 as an end-of-summer party among a group of 40 to 50 friends, both straight and gay. They billed their event as "Southern Decadence Party: Come as Your Favorite Southern Decadent". People who attended were required to dress as their favorite decadent Southerner. Two weeks later, the group threw another party as a farewell to Michael Evers, who left to join his lover David Randolph in Michigan. The first small "walking parade" occurred the following year when the participants first met at Johnny Matassa's Bar in the French Quarter to show off their costumes; they then walked back home to Belle Reve, a name taken from A Streetcar Named Desire, in the Tremé neighbourhood via Esplanade Avenue. This first group impersonated people and characters, such as Belle Watling (the prostitute character in Gone with the Wind), Mary Ann Mobley, Tallulah Bankhead, and Helen Keller. The event expanded with Frederick Douglas Wright, an African American, appointed as the first grand marshal by members of the original group in 1974, who had complete control over the parade of characters and costumes as they marched through the French Quarter.

There was no party in 2020.

== Characteristics ==
Decadence, as it is commonly known by participants, is marked by having parades, bead tossing, and having street parties and dance parties. It resembles New Orleans Mardi Gras, but Southern Decadence is sexual in tone. Decadence crowds in the French Quarter typically match or exceed Mardi Gras crowds. Most events take place in or around the French Quarter, centered at the intersection of Bourbon and St. Ann streets.

Crowds range from 100,000 to 300,000 revelers from across the world. In 2018, there were over 250,000 participants and the positive economic impact on the City of New Orleans was estimated at over $275 million.

Decadence caters primarily to gay men, but it is lesbian-friendly. Dykes on Bikes and other lesbian groups participate in the annual parade in the French Quarter and GrrlSpot (a lesbian party promoter) sponsors a few events for lesbians.

== Themes ==
Themes were presented on and off from the beginning, but themes did not become a consistent fixture of the event until the 1988 "Plagues, Pests, Parasites" theme. They have been featured every year that the Decadence has been held since then. They have ranged from themes as varied as "Voodoo That You Do", "Menage à Trois", "Ancient Truths, Lies, and Sacrifice", and "Hurricane: This Year, They Blow Back."

The theme for 2018 was "House of Bourbon -- Unleash Your Beast", and for 2019 “Fruit Salad: Come Toss a Good Time”.

== Opposition ==
In years past, religious and conservative groups have rallied against the festival. In 2003, there was a formal petition filed to have the event terminated, with video footage handed over to officials depicting dozens of men engaged in "public sex acts". There were examples of men exposing themselves to others for beads, similar to the way women have exposed their breasts during the traditional Mardi Gras balcony bead toss. The complaints led to a vocal response from business owners and hoteliers in New Orleans in support of the festival. Ultimately the police posted notices clarifying what constitutes public sex. Grant Storms, the pastor who spearheaded, videotaped, and filed the petition, was arrested in February 2011 after being caught masturbating in a public park. He was convicted of obscenity on August 22, 2012.

The city later passed an ordinance that effectively banned the dissemination of any social, political, or religious message on Bourbon Street from sunset to sunrise, punishable by up to six months in jail and a $500 fine. City Councilwoman Kristin Palmer, who sponsored the ordinance, said the city "has a legitimate interest in protecting residents and visitors in the highly trafficked area of Bourbon Street at night. She said aggressive solicitation can be a crowd control issue, and people are allowed under the law to speak their messages if they take five steps off Bourbon Street. This is really an issue of trying to protect public safety."

Nine preachers and activists were arrested on September 1, 2012 after they allegedly yelled slurs at people attending Southern Decadence on Bourbon Street. Represented by the American Civil Liberties Union during the first round of their case, those arrested saw the law temporarily suspended via a restraining order that was granted by a federal judge.

Later the New Orleans City Council voted to lift the 2011 ordinance banning Street Preaching from sunset to sunrise on the city's famous Bourbon Street.

The city restrictions which (prohibited a person or group from gathering on Bourbon Street) "for the purpose of disseminating any social, political or religious message" was "so patently unconstitutional that they could not hope the judge would rule otherwise", said attorney Nate Kellum with the Center for Religious Expression.

A 2018 Vice News documentary hosted by Jamali Maddix featured prominent American Christian street preacher Ruben Israel and his Bible Believers group, which publicly protests Southern Decadence. The group often yells slurs at and harasses attendees.

== Cancellations ==
=== Hurricane Katrina ===
The 2005 edition of Southern Decadence was officially cancelled in the wake of safety precautions against Hurricane Katrina. However, a small group of residents who still remained in the French Quarter celebrated the event anyway. An abbreviated parade took place in the French Quarter with some two dozen participants. Most were French Quarter hold-outs; there were also at least a couple of people who had to wade in through flooded streets from other neighbourhoods to get there. As the city was officially being evacuated at the time, a police officer at first attempted to stop the small observation of tradition, but one of the participants was able to produce the parade permit issued pre-Katrina showing it was a scheduled legal event, and the small procession was allowed to continue. National media reporters noted the event. It was the first parade in New Orleans after the hurricane, the most recent previous New Orleans parade having been the Krewe of OAK "Midsummer Mardi Gras" parade the night before the city's mandatory evacuation.

With the theme "Southern Decadence Rebirth", the event rebounded in 2006, attracting near-normal crowds.

In 2007, the Bourbon Street Extravaganza, annually hosted by Napoleon's Itch, saw Deborah Cox, Fredrick Ford, Jeanie Tracy and Mat Jordan headline the festival.

=== Hurricane Gustav ===
Due to the approach of Hurricane Gustav in 2008 and a mandatory evacuation notice, some events on Saturday and all official Southern Decadence events after Sunday, August 31 midday were cancelled that year. As a result of Sunday's parade being cancelled, the 2008 Southern Decadence Grand Marshals, Paloma (Samson Utley) and Tittie Toulouse (Gary Delaune), returned for 2009. However, as was the case with 2005, a small group of French Quarter residents still celebrated the 2008 event anyway with an "unofficial" parade taking place once again in the French Quarter. This parade had some two-dozen participants, just like three years earlier.

With the theme "Hurricane: This Year, They Blow Back", the event once again rebounded as a whole in 2009, attracting near-normal crowds.

=== COVID-19 pandemic ===
2020's edition of Southern Decadence was officially cancelled in the wake of the COVID-19 pandemic. The 2021 edition was also cancelled due to continued concerns surrounding the COVID-19 pandemic, plus the effects of Hurricane Ida on South Louisiana.

== Publication ==
- Southern Decadence in New Orleans (2018) by Howard Philips Smith and Frank Perez | Foreword by Robert Laurent | Afterword by Maureen Block
