= South Mississippi State Hospital =

Geography
- Location: Lamar County, Mississippi, United States
- Coordinates: 31.166845°N 89.426189°W

Organization
- Type: psychiatric hospital

History
- Opened: after 1995

Links
- Website: www.smsh.state.ms.us
- Lists: Hospitals in Mississippi

The South Mississippi State Hospital (SMSH) is an acute care regional psychiatric facility of the Mississippi Department of Mental Health located in unincorporated Lamar County, Mississippi, near Purvis. The institution's Crisis Intervention Center is in Laurel.

In its 1995 session, the Mississippi State Legislature passed House Bill 960, authorizing the construction of the facility. The hospital, a regional center, serves Covington, Forrest, George, Greene, Hancock, Harrison, Jackson, Jefferson Davis, Jones, Lamar, Marion, Pearl River, Perry, Stone, and Wayne counties.
