= Mississippi Department of Mental Health =

The Mississippi Department of Mental Health (DMH) is a state agency of Mississippi, headquartered in Suite 1101 of the Robert E. Lee Building in Jackson. It provides mental health services.

== Facilities ==
- Mississippi State Hospital
- East Mississippi State Hospital
- North Mississippi State Hospital
- South Mississippi State Hospital
- Central Mississippi Residential Center
- Specialized Treatment Facility
