= West Hattiesburg, Mississippi =

- Census-designated place
- Location of West Hattiesburg, Mississippi

- Location in the United States
- Coordinates: 31°19′16″N 89°22′3″W
- Country: United States
- State: Mississippi
- County: Lamar

Area
  - Total: 2.49 sq mi (6.45 km^{2})
  - Land: 2.41 sq mi (6.25 km^{2})
  - Water: 0.077 sq mi (0.20 km^{2})
- Elevation: 253 ft (77 m)

Population (2020)
  - Total: 6,006
  - Density: 2,488.6/sq mi (960.87/km^{2})
- Time zone: UTC−6 (Central (CST))
  - Summer (DST): UTC−5 (CDT)
- FIPS code: 28-78890
- GNIS feature ID: 2403004

West Hattiesburg is an unincorporated area and census-designated place (CDP) in Lamar County, Mississippi, west of the city of Hattiesburg and east of the community of Oak Grove. It is part of the Hattiesburg metropolitan area. As of the 2020 census, West Hattiesburg had a population of 6,006.

== Geography ==
West Hattiesburg is in northeastern Lamar County and is bordered to the north, east, and south by the city of Hattiesburg. The area of West Hattiesburg dropped from 7.2 square miles (19 km^{2}) at the 2000 census to 2.49 square miles (6.45 km^{2}) as of 2019, primarily due to annexation of land by the city of Hattiesburg. Of the CDP's area in 2019, 0.1 square miles (0.2 km^{2}), or 0.31%, are water. Lairds Lake is the main water body in the community.

== Demographics ==
Historical population
| Census | Pop. | Note | %± |
|---|---|---|---|
| 2000 | 6,305 | | — |
| 2010 | 5,909 | | −6.3% |
| 2020 | 6,006 | | 1.6% |
U.S. Decennial Census

=== 2020 census ===
As of the 2020 census, West Hattiesburg had a population of 6,006. The median age was 31.5 years. 27.9% of residents were under the age of 18 and 12.0% were 65 years of age or older. For every 100 females there were 83.7 males, and for every 100 females age 18 and over there were 77.1 males.

100.0% of residents lived in urban areas, while 0.0% lived in rural areas.

There were 2,394 households, including 1,478 family households. Of all households, 36.6% had children under the age of 18 living in them, 33.2% were married-couple households, 19.8% were households with a male householder and no spouse or partner present, and 40.4% were households with a female householder and no spouse or partner present. About 30.8% of all households were made up of individuals and 9.2% had someone living alone who was 65 years of age or older.

There were 2,676 housing units, of which 10.5% were vacant. The homeowner vacancy rate was 2.3% and the rental vacancy rate was 11.5%.

West Hattiesburg racial composition
| Race | Num. | Perc. |
|---|---|---|
| White (non-Hispanic) | 2,055 | 34.22% |
| Black or African American (non-Hispanic) | 2,849 | 47.44% |
| Native American | 8 | 0.13% |
| Asian | 173 | 2.88% |
| Pacific Islander | 22 | 0.37% |
| Other/Mixed | 258 | 4.3% |
| Hispanic or Latino | 641 | 10.67% |

=== 2000 census ===
As of the census of 2000, there were 6,305 people, 4,464 households, and 2,601 families residing in the CDP. The population density was 892.0 inhabitants per square mile (344.4/km^{2}). There were 2,633 housing units at an average density of 372.5 per square mile (143.8/km^{2}). The racial makeup of the CDP was 74.88% White, 22.11% African American, 0.06% Native American, 1.63% Asian, 0.29% from other races, and 1.03% from two or more races. Hispanic or Latino of any race were 1.38% of the population.

There were 2,464 households, out of which 32.9% had children under the age of 18 living with them, 47.3% were married couples living together, 14.0% had a female householder with no husband present, and 35.0% were non-families. 24.0% of all households were made up of individuals, and 6.7% had someone living alone who was 65 years of age or older. The average household size was 2.50 and the average family size was 3.00.

In the CDP, the population was spread out, with 25.5% under the age of 18, 15.7% from 18 to 24, 30.8% from 25 to 44, 19.2% from 45 to 64, and 8.8% who were 65 years of age or older. The median age was 30 years. For every 100 females, there were 91.1 males. For every 100 females age 18 and over, there were 87.2 males.

The median income for a household in the CDP was $44,663, and the median income for a family was $68,287. Males had a median income of $49,552 versus $43,873 for females. The per capita income for the CDP was $38,988. None of the families and none of the population were living below the poverty line, including no under eighteens and none of those over 64.

== Incorporation ==
A movement for incorporation has been attempted repeatedly over the years, but the courts have not ruled on the substance of it.

== Roads ==
Two major highways pass near West Hattiesburg. Interstate 59 forms the eastern border of the community, and U.S. Highway 98 passes just north of the current CDP, through land annexed by the city of Hattiesburg.

== Education ==
The Lamar County School District serves West Hattiesburg, via the schools in the Oak Grove area.

=== High school ===
- Oak Grove High School (Grades 9–12)

=== Middle school ===
- Oak Grove Middle School (Grades 6–8)

=== Elementary schools ===
- Oak Grove Upper Elementary School (Grades 4–5)
- Oak Grove Lower Elementary School (Grades 2–3)
- Long Leaf Elementary School (Grades K-5)
- Oak Grove Primary School (Grades K-1)
