= Lamar County, Mississippi =

County in Mississippi, United States

- County
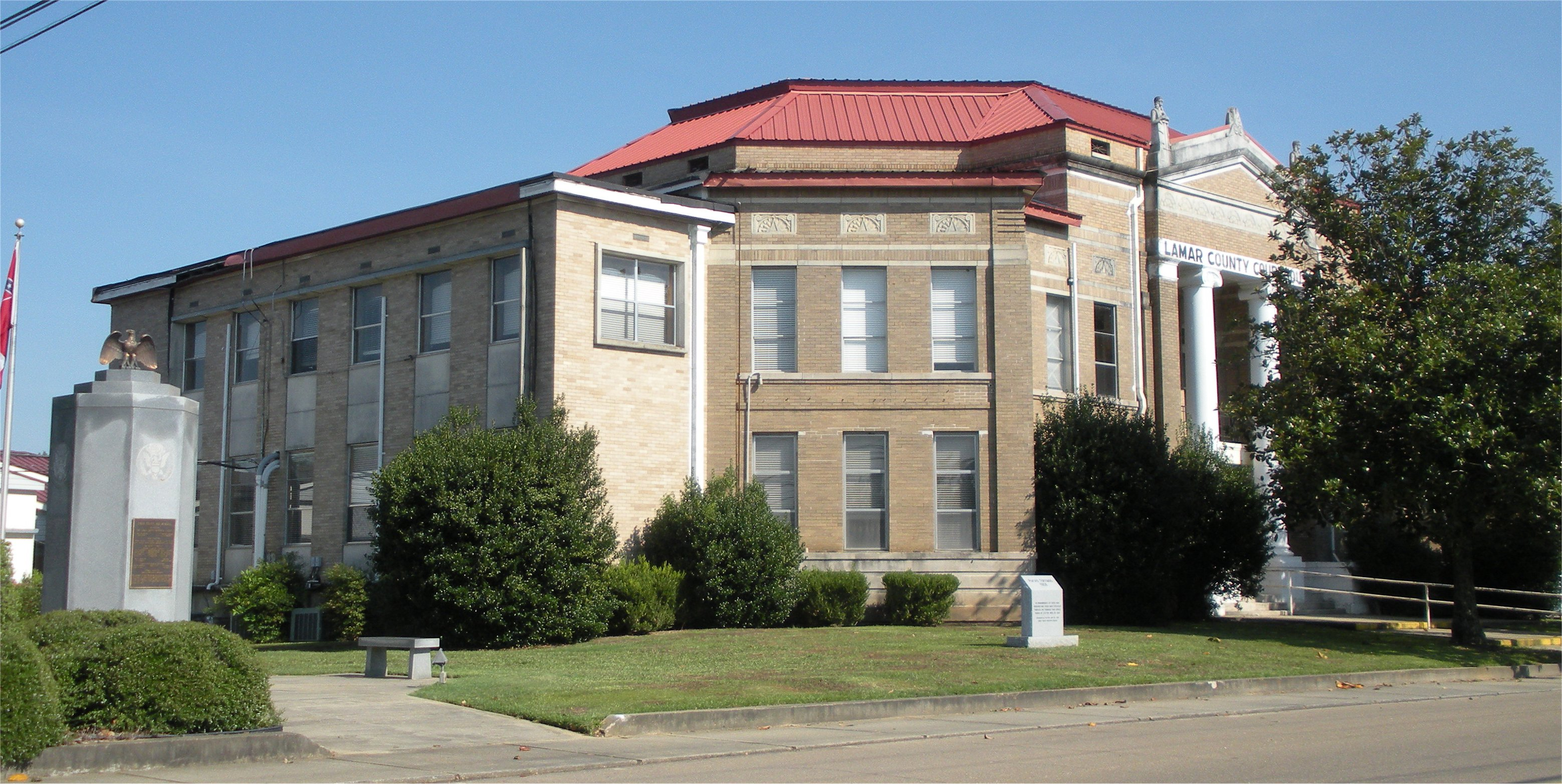
- Lamar County Courthouse in Purvis

- Location within the U.S. state of Mississippi
- Coordinates: 31°13′N 89°31′W
- Country: United States
- State: Mississippi
- Founded: 1904
- Named for: Lucius Quintus Cincinnatus Lamar
- Seat: Purvis
- Largest community: West Hattiesburg

Area
  - Total: 500 sq mi (1,300 km^{2})
  - Land: 497 sq mi (1,290 km^{2})
  - Water: 3.4 sq mi (8.8 km^{2}) 0.7%

Population (2020)
  - Total: 64,222
  - Estimate (2025): 67,403 ▲
  - Density: 129/sq mi (49.9/km^{2})
- Time zone: UTC−6 (Central)
  - Summer (DST): UTC−5 (CDT)
- Congressional district: 4th
- Website: lamarcountyms.gov

Lamar County is a county located in the U.S. state of Mississippi. As of the 2020 census, the population was 64,222. Its county seat is Purvis. Named for Confederate Lucius Quintus Cincinnatus Lamar, the county was carved out of Marion County to the west in 1904.

Lamar County is part of the Hattiesburg metropolitan area. It is largely a rural county, except for its northeast quarter.

== Geography ==
According to the U.S. Census Bureau, the county has a total area of 500 square miles (1,300 km^{2}), of which 497 square miles (1,290 km^{2}) is land and 3.4 square miles (8.8 km^{2}) (0.7%) is water.

=== Major highways ===
- Interstate 59
- U.S. Highway 11
- U.S. Highway 98
- Mississippi Highway 13
- Mississippi Highway 42
- Mississippi Highway 44

=== Adjacent counties ===
- Covington County (north)
- Forrest County (east)
- Pearl River County (south)
- Marion County (west)
- Jefferson Davis County (northwest)

== Demographics ==
Historical population
Census	Pop.	Note	%±
1910	11,741		—
1920	12,869		9.6%
1930	12,848		−0.2%
1940	12,096		−5.9%
1950	13,225		9.3%
1960	13,675		3.4%
1970	15,209		11.2%
1980	23,821		56.6%
1990	30,424		27.7%
2000	39,070		28.4%
2010	55,658		42.5%
2020	64,222		15.4%
2025 (est.)	67,403	▲	5.0%
U.S. Decennial Census; 1790-1960 1900-1990; 1990-2000 2010-2013

=== Racial and ethnic composition ===
Lamar County, Mississippi – Racial and ethnic composition Note: the US Census treats Hispanic/Latino as an ethnic category. This table excludes Latinos from the racial categories and assigns them to a separate category. Hispanics/Latinos may be of any race.
Race / Ethnicity (NH = Non-Hispanic)	Pop 1980	Pop 1990	Pop 2000	Pop 2010	Pop 2020	% 1980	% 1990	% 2000	% 2010	% 2020
White alone (NH)	20,959	26,477	33,090	42,296	43,865	87.99%	87.03%	84.69%	75.99%	68.30%
Black or African American alone (NH)	2,539	3,628	5,027	10,834	14,296	10.66%	11.92%	12.87%	19.47%	22.26%
Native American or Alaska Native alone (NH)	15	37	61	109	108	0.06%	0.12%	0.16%	0.20%	0.17%
Asian alone (NH)	53	113	245	655	1,091	0.22%	0.37%	0.63%	1.18%	1.70%
Native Hawaiian or Pacific Islander alone (NH)	x	x	4	19	50	x	x	0.01%	0.03%	0.08%
Other race alone (NH)	13	1	12	33	206	0.05%	0.00%	0.03%	0.06%	0.32%
Mixed race or Multiracial (NH)	x	x	205	507	2,244	x	x	0.52%	0.91%	3.49%
Hispanic or Latino (any race)	242	168	426	1,205	2,362	1.02%	0.55%	1.09%	2.17%	3.68%
Total	23,821	30,424	39,070	55,658	64,222	100.00%	100.00%	100.00%	100.00%	100.00%

=== 2020 census ===
As of the 2020 census, the county had a population of 64,222. The median age was 34.8 years. 25.8% of residents were under the age of 18 and 13.8% of residents were 65 years of age or older. For every 100 females there were 90.0 males, and for every 100 females age 18 and over there were 86.8 males age 18 and over.

The racial makeup of the county was 69.2% White, 22.4% Black or African American, 0.2% American Indian and Alaska Native, 1.7% Asian, 0.1% Native Hawaiian and Pacific Islander, 1.9% from some other race, and 4.5% from two or more races. Hispanic or Latino residents of any race comprised 3.7% of the population.

46.3% of residents lived in urban areas, while 53.7% lived in rural areas.

There were 25,001 households in the county, of which 35.4% had children under the age of 18 living in them. Of all households, 48.3% were married-couple households, 16.4% were households with a male householder and no spouse or partner present, and 29.7% were households with a female householder and no spouse or partner present. About 26.0% of all households were made up of individuals and 9.0% had someone living alone who was 65 years of age or older.

There were 27,434 housing units, of which 8.9% were vacant. Among occupied housing units, 65.5% were owner-occupied and 34.5% were renter-occupied. The homeowner vacancy rate was 1.6% and the rental vacancy rate was 9.3%.

== Politics ==
Lamar County, historically, is one of the most conservative counties in Mississippi. The county has voted for Republican presidential candidates with 60 percent or more of the vote in the past twelve elections.

United States presidential election results for Lamar County, Mississippi
Year	Republican		Democratic		Third party(ies)	
Year	No.	%	No.	%	No.	%
1912	16	3.17%	399	79.01%	90	17.82%
1916	89	10.09%	744	84.35%	49	5.56%
1920	192	21.74%	672	76.10%	19	2.15%
1924	80	8.78%	795	87.27%	36	3.95%
1928	410	36.35%	718	63.65%	0	0.00%
1932	31	2.90%	1,033	96.63%	5	0.47%
1936	91	6.97%	1,210	92.65%	5	0.38%
1940	55	4.57%	1,148	95.43%	0	0.00%
1944	93	8.03%	1,065	91.97%	0	0.00%
1948	36	2.45%	91	6.19%	1,342	91.35%
1952	1,034	45.07%	1,260	54.93%	0	0.00%
1956	429	24.97%	805	46.86%	484	28.17%
1960	636	27.26%	651	27.90%	1,046	44.83%
1964	3,372	90.99%	334	9.01%	0	0.00%
1968	546	10.27%	351	6.60%	4,422	83.14%
1972	5,022	88.38%	493	8.68%	167	2.94%
1976	4,056	54.71%	3,109	41.93%	249	3.36%
1980	5,395	63.13%	3,005	35.16%	146	1.71%
1984	7,929	79.85%	1,964	19.78%	37	0.37%
1988	9,145	77.86%	2,535	21.58%	66	0.56%
1992	8,259	63.37%	3,208	24.62%	1,565	12.01%
1996	8,609	67.39%	3,169	24.81%	996	7.80%
2000	12,795	77.07%	3,478	20.95%	329	1.98%
2004	16,410	80.19%	3,923	19.17%	132	0.65%
2008	18,497	77.36%	5,159	21.58%	254	1.06%
2012	19,101	76.74%	5,494	22.07%	294	1.18%
2016	18,751	76.25%	5,190	21.10%	651	2.65%
2020	20,704	72.68%	7,340	25.77%	441	1.55%
2024	20,775	73.75%	7,038	24.98%	358	1.27%

== Government and infrastructure ==
The Mississippi Department of Mental Health operates the South Mississippi State Hospital in unincorporated Lamar County, near Purvis.

== Communities ==
=== Cities ===
- Hattiesburg (mostly in Forrest County)
- Lumberton (partly in Pearl River County)
- Purvis (county seat)

=== Town ===
- Sumrall

=== Census-designated places ===
- Arnold Line
- Baxterville
- Oak Grove
- West Hattiesburg

=== Other unincorporated communities ===
- Bellevue
- Okahola
- Oloh
- Talowah

== Education ==
School districts include:

- Hattiesburg Public School District
- Lamar County School District

Former school districts:

- Lumberton Public School District - Merged into the Lamar County district in 2018.

The county is in the service area of Pearl River Community College.

== See also ==
- Salmon Site, nuclear tests site
- National Register of Historic Places listings in Lamar County, Mississippi
