= C. P. Dunphey =

American author (born 1992)

Charles Patrick Dunphey (born November 22, 1992) is an American author from Staten Island, New York who lives in southern Mississippi.

His debut work, a science fiction horror novel titled Plane Walker, was released in April 2016. Dunphey is also a film reviewer, and founder of the small press Gehenna & Hinnom Books.

Dunphey holds a bachelor's in English from the University of Southern Mississippi.

== Early life ==
C. P. Dunphey was born in Staten Island, New York before moving to Brooklyn, New York. After his father received a job offer in Mississippi, Dunphey and his family moved to Meridian, Mississippi before settling in Picayune, Mississippi. From a very young age, Dunphey was fascinated with science fiction and horror, often filling composition notebooks front to back with space operas and horror stories. After graduating from Picayune Memorial High School, Dunphey would attend Pearl River Community College in Poplarville, Mississippi where he would receive his Associate's in Arts. Then he moved to Hattiesburg, Mississippi and received his Bachelor's in English from the University of Southern Mississippi.

== Writing career ==
C. P. Dunphey's first credited publication was in December 2012 when he was 19 years old. The novel titled Lazarus, which would evolve into Plane Walker four years later, was released independently. From 2012 to 2016, Dunphey worked on the manuscript he originally self-published and ended up adding over a hundred pages of content while also having the manuscript undergo extensive professional edits and reconstruction. The publication of Plane Walker and the formation of Gehenna Publishing House followed a difficult period in Dunphey's life.

In April 2016, the finished product of Plane Walker was released on Amazon

== Influences ==
C. P. Dunphey has cited several authors of being inspirations to him as an author. Most notably, he has called H. P. Lovecraft his favorite author while stating Frank Herbert's Dune as his favorite novel. Other inspirations that have been mentioned are H.P. Lovecraft, Thomas Ligotti, Stephen King, J.R.R. Tolkien, and others. Readers and reviewers have described Dunphey's style as poetic and lyrical while maintaining a horror and science fiction scope. Dunphey is also a self-proclaimed science fiction and horror nut, finding inspiration for his writing in such films as Event Horizon, The Texas Chain Saw massacre, Jacob's Ladder, The Alien Franchise, The Terminator Franchise, and video game series such as Dead Space.
