= Pearl River County Library System =

Coordinates: 30.531168°N 89.688611°W

- Location: Pearl River County, Mississippi
- Established: 1974
- Branches: 2

Collection
- Size: 100,000

Access and use
- Population served: 55,834

Other information
- Director: Carol Phares
- Website: https://pearlriver.lib.ms.us/

The Pearl River County Library System serves the people of Pearl River County. Its headquarters are located at the Margaret Reed Crosby Memorial Library in Picayune, Mississippi and a branch library is in Poplarville, Mississippi.
