= Angela Burks Hill =

American politician

Member of the Mississippi State Senate from the 40th district
- Incumbent
- Assumed office January 3, 2012
- Preceded by: Sidney Albritton

Personal details
- Born: Angela Kay Burks Hill; August 14, 1965 (age 60) Picayune, Mississippi
- Party: Republican
- Education: Picayune Memorial High School
- Alma mater: Pearl River Community College (AA); University of Southern Mississippi (BS)

Angela Kay Burks Hill (born August 14, 1965) is an American politician who has served in the Mississippi State Senate from the 40th district since 2012.

== Early life and education ==
Hill was born on August 14, 1965, in Picayune, Mississippi. Her grandfather, Delos Burks, served in the Mississippi House of Represesentatives for the 108th district.

She went to Picayune Memorial High School, graduating as valedictorian in 1983. She graduated from Pearl River Community College with a perfect GPA and later the University of Southern Mississippi with her Bachelor of Science in 1991. She specialized in science education and worked as a teacher.

== Career ==
A Republican, Hill has represented District 40 in the Mississippi State Senate since 2012; her district covers parts of Marion and Pearl River County and used to represent parts of Walthall County.

=== Elections ===
Hill announced her candidacy for District 40 in June 2011, running against incumbent two-term Senator Sidney Albritton. She campaigned on providing conservative leadership and not becoming a career politician. She also campaigned on education issues, such as increasing vocational education and prioritizing classroom teachers. In the three-way Republican primary, she forced Albritton to a run-off election by securing 34% of the vote. She won in the run-off with 52% of the vote and proceeded to the general uncontested.

== Personal life ==
Hill is married with two children. She is Baptist.
