= Jesse Stockstill =

Jesse E. Stockstill (November 11, 1884 – ?) was a lawyer, city attorney, and state legislator in Mississippi. He served in the Mississippi House of Representatives and the Mississippi Sovereignty Commission.

He graduated from Poplarville High School in 1906. He lived in Picayune, Mississippi and served as City Attorney. He represented Pearl River County. He served on the Mississippi Sovereignty Commission from 1960–1964.

He had a son and grandson named after him.
