= Jansen Owen =

American politician from the state of Mississippi

Jansen Tosh Owen

Member of the Mississippi House of Representatives from the 106th district
- Incumbent
- Assumed office January 7, 2020
- Preceded by: John Glen Corley

Personal details
- Born: Jansen Tosh Owen; July 2, 1993 (age 33) Hattiesburg, Mississippi, U.S.
- Party: Republican
- Children: 2
- Education: Tulane University Law School (JD); University of Southern Mississippi (BA); Pearl River Community College (AA)
- Occupation: Politician, Attorney

Military service
- Allegiance: United States
- Branch: United States Army
- Years of service: 2016–present (reserve)
- Rank: First Lieutenant
- Unit: Army National Guard

Jansen Tosh Owen (born July 2, 1993) is an American attorney and politician, representing the 106th district in the Mississippi House of Representatives since 2020.

== Early life and education ==
Owen was born on July 2, 1993, in Hattiesburg, Mississippi, and attended Poplarville High School. Afterwards, he enrolled at Pearl River Community College, where he graduated with an associate's degree. He then earned a bachelor's degree in political science from the University of Southern Mississippi. Owen received his Juris Doctor from Tulane University Law School in New Orleans, Louisiana, in 2019, where he served as a managing editor of the Tulane Law Review. He was admitted to The Mississippi Bar in 2019 and practices law in Poplarville, Mississippi.

In 2016, Owen enlisted in the Mississippi Army National Guard and later commissioned as a judge advocate.

== Legislative career ==
Owen challenged incumbent Representative John Glen Corley in the Republican Primary election in 2019. In the primary election, Owen ran against incumbent Corley and two others: Gregory Holcomb, a local attorney, and Ben Winston, the former Mayor of Lumberton, Mississippi. Owen placed first in the Republican Primary election on August 6, 2019, garnering 41.5% of the vote to Corley's 30.6%. He defeated Corley with 60.4% of the vote in the runoff election on August 27, 2019, and faced no opposition in the general election.

He was sworn into office on January 3, 2020, and is the youngest currently serving member of the Mississippi Legislature.

For the 2021 House session, Owen serves on the following committees: Apportionment and Elections, Transportation, Judiciary B, Agriculture, and Youth and Family Affairs.

=== Electoral record ===
2019 Republican primary: Mississippi House of Representatives, District 106
Party	Candidate	Votes	%
Republican	Jansen Owen	2,046	41.5%
Republican	John Glen Corley	1,506	30.6%
Republican	Greg Holcomb	872	17.7%
Republican	Ben Winston	505	10.2%

2019 Republican primary runoff: Mississippi House of Representatives, District 106
Party	Candidate	Votes	%
Republican	Jansen Owen	2,426	61.4%
Republican	John Glen Corley	1,526	38.6%

== Political positions ==
During the 2019 election, Owen campaigned on reducing tax and regulatory burdens, combating public corruption by increasing government transparency, and cutting wasteful spending.

In 2020, Owen voted yes on the bill to change the Mississippi State Flag.

== Legal career ==
Owen is an attorney, and continued to practice after being elected to the legislature. On December 17, 2024, his client, Tanya Saucier, shot her ex-husband dead outside the Poplarville, Mississippi, courthouse where their divorce had just been finalized. Owen, who witnessed the murder, said there was "no justification" for the killing.

== Personal life ==
Owen has two sons.
