= Senator Albritton =

Senator Albritton may refer to:

- Ben Albritton (born 1968), Florida State Senate
- Greg Albritton (born 1952), Alabama State Senate
- Sidney Albritton (born 1971), Mississippi State Senate
