= Glen Day =

American professional golfer (born 1965)

Personal information
- Full name: Glen Edward Day
- Nickname: All Day
- Nationality: United States
- Born: November 16, 1965 (age 60) Mobile, Alabama, U.S.
- Height: 5 ft 10 in (1.78 m)
- Weight: 170 lb (77 kg; 12 st)

Career
- Sport: Golf
- College: University of Oklahoma
- Turned professional: 1988
- Current tour: PGA Tour Champions
- Former tour: PGA Tour
- Professional wins: 2
- Highest ranking: 30 (February 13, 2000)

Number of wins by tour
- PGA Tour: 1
- Other: 1

Best results in major championships
- Masters Tournament: T19: 2000
- PGA Championship: T15: 1994
- U.S. Open: T23: 1998
- The Open Championship: CUT: 1993, 1997-99, 2004, 2010

Glen Edward Day (born November 16, 1965) is an American professional golfer who plays on the PGA Tour Champions. He was formerly a member of the PGA Tour.

== Early life and amateur career ==
Day was born in Mobile, Alabama, and raised in Poplarville, Mississippi, by his mother Jeanne Bass Day. His mother was widowed at the age of 28 when Glen was approximately 2 years of age. His grandfather Glyndol Bass, was young Glen's primary male role model. Bass, an avid golfer and member at Pearl River Valley Country Club just outside Poplarville, started Glen playing golf when he was 2 to 3 years of age. By the age of 10, he held a 5 handicap and was able to regularly shoot par on 18 holes.

In 1983, Day graduated from Poplarville High School. He then attended the University of Oklahoma.

== Professional career ==
In 1988, Day turned professional. Day won the 1999 MCI Classic defeating Payne Stewart in a playoff. It was his 154th PGA Tour start and his only PGA Tour win. In 2000, the first of two top-10s came at the first event of the season with a T-8 in the Mercedes Championship. In 2001, he came in 4th in the MasterCard Colonial, and tied for 6th in the AT&T Pebble Beach National Pro-Am. In his forties, Day split his playing time between the PGA Tour and the Nationwide Tour. He later joined the PGA Tour Champions after turning 50.

Day is notorious for being an extremely deliberate player on the golf course. In fact, the moniker "All Day," was hung on him by the legendary Jack Nicklaus. Day is one of the few golfers to receive a slow play penalty in a non-major (1995 Honda Classic).

Day is also a golf course architect, forming Day-Blalock Golf Course Design with Alan Blalock in 1999. He has featured in the top 50 of the Official World Golf Rankings, peaking at 30th in 2000.

== Personal life ==
Day is married and has two daughters. He lives in Little Rock, Arkansas.

== Professional wins (2) ==
=== PGA Tour wins (1) ===
No.	Date	Tournament	Winning score	Margin of victory	Runners-up
1	Apr 18, 1999	MCI Classic	−10 (70-68-70-66=274)	Playoff	(United States) Jeff Sluman, (United States) Payne Stewart

PGA Tour playoff record (1–0)

No.	Year	Tournament	Opponents	Result
1	1999	MCI Classic	(United States) Jeff Sluman, (United States) Payne Stewart	Won with birdie on first extra hole

=== Asia Golf Circuit wins (1) ===
No.	Date	Tournament	Winning score	Margin of victory	Runners-up
1	Apr 1, 1990	Benson & Hedges Malaysian Open	−15 (69-69-68-67=273)	4 strokes	(Taiwan) Chen Liang-hsi, (Canada) Danny Mijovic

== Playoff record ==
European Tour playoff record (0–1)

No.	Year	Tournament	Opponents	Result
1	1992	BMW International Open	(United States) Paul Azinger, (Sweden) Anders Forsbrand, (England) Mark James, (Germany) Bernhard Langer	Azinger won with birdie on first extra hole

PGA Tour Champions playoff record (0–1)

No.	Year	Tournament	Opponents	Result
1	2020	Charles Schwab Series at Bass Pro Shops Big Cedar Lodge	(United States) Shane Bertsch, (Germany) Bernhard Langer, (United States) Kenny Perry	Bertsch won with eagle on first extra hole

== Results in major championships ==
Tournament	1993	1994	1995	1996	1997	1998	1999
Masters Tournament							CUT
U.S. Open		CUT	CUT			T23	CUT
The Open Championship	CUT				CUT	CUT	CUT
PGA Championship		T15	CUT	T41	CUT	T29	CUT

Tournament	2000	2001	2002	2003	2004	2005	2006	2007	2008	2009	2010
Masters Tournament	T19										
U.S. Open	CUT	CUT									
The Open Championship					CUT						CUT
PGA Championship	T51	CUT									

Did not play

CUT = missed the half-way cut
"T" = tied

=== Summary ===
Tournament	Wins	2nd	3rd	Top-5	Top-10	Top-25	Events	Cuts made
Masters Tournament	0	0	0	0	0	1	2	1
U.S. Open	0	0	0	0	0	1	6	1
The Open Championship	0	0	0	0	0	0	6	0
PGA Championship	0	0	0	0	0	1	8	4
Totals	0	0	0	0	0	3	22	6

- Most consecutive cuts made – 1 (six times)
- Longest streak of top-10s – 0

== Results in The Players Championship ==
Tournament	1995	1996	1997	1998	1999	2000	2001	2002	2003	2004
The Players Championship	CUT	CUT	61	T2	CUT	CUT	CUT	T36	T27	T22

Top 10

CUT = missed the halfway cut
"T" indicates a tie for a place

== Results in World Golf Championships ==
Tournament	1999	2000	2001
Match Play	R64	R64	R32
Championship	DQ		NT^{1}
Invitational			

^{1}Cancelled due to 9/11

Did not play

QF, R16, R32, R64 = Round in which player lost in match play
"T" = Tied
DQ = Disqualified
NT = No tournament

== See also ==
- 1993 PGA Tour Qualifying School graduates
- 2006 PGA Tour Qualifying School graduates
