= Tommie Dukes =

American baseball player

- Catcher
- Born: September 24, 1906; Picayune, Mississippi, U.S.
- Died: January 5, 1991 (aged 84); Lumberton, Mississippi, U.S.
- Batted: Left Threw: Right

Negro league baseball debut
- 1928, for the Chicago American Giants

Last appearance
- 1945, for the Chicago American Giants
- Stats at Baseball Reference

Teams
- Chicago American Giants (1928); Cuban House of David (1931); Memphis Red Sox (1932); Nashville Elite Giants (1932–1934); Homestead Grays (1935–1939); Toledo Crawfords (1939); Chicago American Giants (1945)

Tommie Dukes (September 24, 1906 – January 5, 1991), nicknamed "Dixie", was an American Negro league baseball catcher between 1928 and 1945.

A native of Picayune, Mississippi, Dukes made his Negro leagues debut in 1928 with the Chicago American Giants. He went on to play for several teams, including the Cuban House of David, Nashville Elite Giants and Homestead Grays, and finished his career back with the American Giants in 1945. Dukes died in Lumberton, Mississippi in 1991 at age 84.
