= Hayden Dunhurst =

American baseball player (born 2000)

Modesto Roadsters
- Catcher
- Born: September 19, 2000 (age 26); Slidell, Louisiana, U.S.
- Bats: Left Throws: Right

Hayden Lane Dunhurst (born September 19, 2000) is an American professional baseball catcher for the Modesto Roadsters of the Pioneer League.

== Amateur career ==
Dunhurst attended Pearl River Central High School in Carriere, Mississippi. He committed to play college baseball for the Ole Miss Rebels after his freshman year, when he hit four home runs and boasted a .476 slugging percentage. Dunhurst did not attend baseball camps or take lessons, instead, he modeled his catching techniques after Yadier Molina and Salvador Pérez by watching YouTube videos. During his sophomore year in 2017, Dunhurst hit ten home runs with 37 RBI and nine doubles. As a senior in 2019, he batted .369 with 11 home runs and 37 RBI. He ended his high school career with 31 home runs. He was selected by the Colorado Rockies in the 37th round of the 2019 Major League Baseball draft, but did not sign.

As a freshman at Ole Miss in 2020, Dunhurst appeared in 17 games and batted .269 with five home runs before the season was cancelled due to the COVID-19 pandemic. In 2021, as a redshirt freshman, Dunhurst made 65 starts and slashed .280/.385/.435 with seven home runs, 43 RBI, and 11 doubles. He won the ABCA/Rawlings Gold Glove award at catcher. After the season, he was named to the USA Baseball Collegiate National Team. Dunhurst entered the 2022 season as a top prospect for the upcoming draft. He missed a brief period at the beginning of the season after tweaking a hamstring. He ended the season batting .231 with six home runs and 30 RBI over 56 games, helping lead Ole Miss to their first ever NCAA Championship.

== Professional career ==
=== Kansas City Royals ===
Dunhurst was drafted by the Kansas City Royals in the sixth round with the 175th overall selection of the 2022 Major League Baseball draft. He signed with the team for $300,000. Dunhurst made his professional debut with the Arizona Complex League Royals.

Dunhurst split the 2023 season between the ACL Royals, Single–A Columbia Fireflies, and High–A Quad Cities River Bandits. In 31 games split between the three affiliates, he hit a combined .164/.241/.289 with two home runs and 15 RBI. On March 27, 2024, Dunhurst was released by the Royals organization.

=== Kane County Cougars ===
On April 26, 2024, Dunhurst signed with the Kane County Cougars of the American Association of Professional Baseball. Dunhurst appeared in 48 games for Kane County, posting a .173 batting average with one home run and 13 RBI. He started in 3 games for the Cougars during their championship run alongside fellow catcher Simon Reid, going hitless in each of those games as the Cougars won the Miles Wolff Cup for the first time since joining the American Association in 2021 and their third title in franchise history.

On March 18, 2025, Dunhurst re-signed with the Cougars. He did not make an appearance for the team before he was released on May 28.

=== Lake Country DockHounds ===
On May 30, 2025, Dunhurst signed with the Lake Country DockHounds of the American Association of Professional Baseball. Dunhurst made 52 appearances for the DockHounds, batting .216/.280/.311 with two home runs and 20 RBI.

=== Modesto Roadsters ===
On January 15, 2026, Dunhurst signed with the Modesto Roadsters of the Pioneer League.
