= Lumberton Public School District =

School district in Mississippi, United States

The Lumberton Public School District was a public school district based in Lumberton, Mississippi, United States.

In addition to Lumberton, the district also served rural areas in southeastern Lamar and northeastern Pearl River counties. The district consolidated into the Lamar County School District in 2018.

The district in 2018 had 600 students, with about 460 in Lamar County and 140 in Pearl River County.

== History ==
Governor of Mississippi Phil Bryant signed Senate Bill 2500, which required this district to consolidate, in 2016. As per the bill, the Commission on the Administrative Consolidation of the Lumberton Public School District was created. This move was praised by the superintendent of the Lumberton district, Linda Smith.

Initially the Lumberton district, as per the senate bill, was to be dissolved effective July 1, 2019, with portions in Lamar County going to the Lamar County School District and Pearl River County portions to the Poplarville Separate School District. By 2018 the Lumberton and Lamar county districts chose to do a voluntary consolidation, effective July 1, 2018, where the entirety of the students living in the Lumberton district, including those in both counties, would continue going to Lumberton school buildings operated by the Lamar district. Poplarville's school board as well as the Pearl River County Board sued to stop the voluntary merger so the school district could obtain a portion of the Lumberton district, but the lawsuit was dismissed. The Mississippi Supreme Court cleared the way for the merger.

Pearl River County Supervisor Hudson Holliday states that if the Lamar County district later closes Lumberton High School, several Pearl River County students would be assigned to Purvis High School even though Poplarville High School is geographically closer to them.

== Schools ==
- Lumberton High School (Grades 9–12)
- Lumberton Elementary & Middle School (Grades K-8)

== Demographics ==
=== 2006-07 school year ===
There were a total of 869 students enrolled in the Lumberton Public School District during the 2006–2007 school year. The gender makeup of the district was 48% female and 52% male. The racial makeup of the district was 44.07% African American, 55.58% White, and 0.35% Hispanic. 76.5% of the district's students were eligible to receive free lunch.

=== Previous school years ===
School Year	Enrollment	Gender Makeup		Racial Makeup				
School Year	Enrollment	Female	Male	Asian	African American	Hispanic	Native American	White
2005-06	824	46%	54%	–	44.30%	0.36%	–	55.34%
2004-05	846	48%	52%	0.47%	43.26%	0.12%	–	56.15%
2003-04	916	50%	50%	0.44%	44.87%	0.11%	0.11%	54.48%
2002-03	913	49%	51%	0.55%	43.59%	0.11%	–	55.75%

== Accountability statistics ==
	2006-07	2005-06	2004-05	2003-04	2002-03
District Accreditation Status	Accredited	Accredited	Accredited	Accredited	Accredited
School Performance Classifications
Level 5 (Superior Performing) Schools	0	0	0	1	0
Level 4 (Exemplary) Schools	0	2	2	0	2
Level 3 (Successful) Schools	2	0	0	1	0
Level 2 (Under Performing) Schools	0	0	0	0	0
Level 1 (Low Performing) Schools	0	0	0	0	0
Not Assigned	0	0	0	0	0

== See also ==
- List of school districts in Mississippi
