= Pearl River County School District =

School district in Mississippi

Coordinates: 30.627523°N 89.652639°W

The Pearl River County School District is a public school district based in the community of Carriere, Mississippi (USA).

In addition to Carriere, the district serves rural areas in south central Pearl River County. A small section of Picayune is in the limits of the school district. The majority of the Hide-A-Way Lake census-designated place is in the district.

The school district’s superintendent is Jeremy Weir.

== Schools ==
- Pearl River Central High School (Grades 9-12)
- Pearl River Central Middle School (Grades 6-8)
  - 2004 National Blue Ribbon School
- Pearl River Central Elementary School (Grades K-5)

== Demographics ==
=== 2006-07 school year ===
There were a total of 3,176 students enrolled in the Pearl River County School District during the 2006–2007 school year. The gender makeup of the district was 48% female and 52% male. The racial makeup of the district was 4.35% African American, 93.80% White, 1.23% Hispanic, 0.31% Asian, and 0.31% Native American. 37.8% of the district's students were eligible to receive free lunch.

=== Previous school years ===
School Year	Enrollment	Gender Makeup		Racial Makeup				
School Year	Enrollment	Female	Male	Asian	African American	Hispanic	Native American	White
2007-08	3,137	48%	52%	0.45%	4.65%	1.12%	0.48%	93.30%
2006-07	3,176	48%	52%	0.31%	4.35%	1.23%	0.31%	93.80%
2005-06	2,984	47%	53%	0.27%	5.16%	1.04%	0.37%	93.16%
2004-05	2,861	48%	52%	0.38%	4.23%	0.66%	0.38%	94.34%
2003-04	2,793	48%	52%	0.36%	3.65%	0.64%	0.36%	94.99%
2002-03	2,720	49%	51%	0.48%	3.90%	0.48%	0.29%	94.85%

== Accountability statistics ==
	2006-07	2005-06	2004-05	2003-04	2002-03
District Accreditation Status	Accredited	Accredited	Accredited	Accredited	Accredited
School Performance Classifications
Level 5 (Superior Performing) Schools	0	1	1	2	1
Level 4 (Exemplary) Schools	2	2	2	1	2
Level 3 (Successful) Schools	1	0	0	0	0
Level 2 (Under Performing) Schools	0	0	0	0	0
Level 1 (Low Performing) Schools	0	0	0	0	0
Not Assigned	1	1	1	0	0

== See also ==
- List of school districts in Mississippi
