= Richie Grant (American football) =

American football player (born 1997)

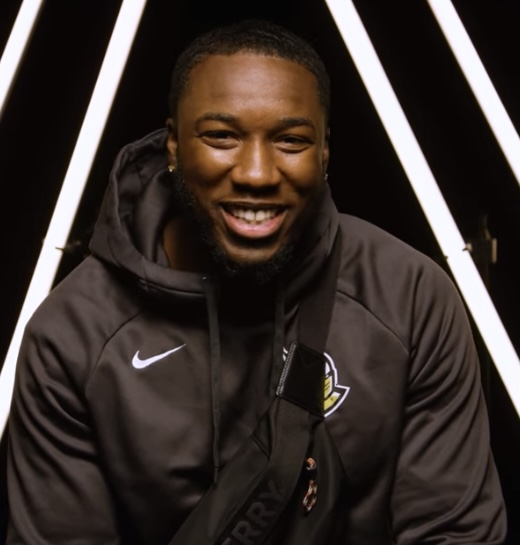
- Grant in 2021

Profile
- Position: Safety

Personal information
- Born: November 9, 1997 (age 28); Lumberton, Mississippi, U.S.
- Listed height: 6 ft 0 in (1.83 m)
- Listed weight: 200 lb (91 kg)

Career information
- High school: Choctawhatchee (Fort Walton Beach, Florida)
- College: UCF (2016–2020)
- NFL draft: 2021: 2nd round, 40th overall pick

Career history
- Atlanta Falcons (2021–2024); San Francisco 49ers (2025)*; New England Patriots (2025)*
- * Offseason or practice squad member only

Awards and highlights
- Colley Matrix national champion (2017); 3× first-team All-AAC (2018-2020)

Career NFL statistics as of 2025
- Tackles: 276
- Sacks: 3
- Forced fumbles: 4
- Fumble recoveries: 2
- Pass deflections: 17
- Interceptions: 3
- Stats at Pro Football Reference

Richie Grant (born November 9, 1997) is an American professional football safety. He played college football for the UCF Knights and was selected by the Atlanta Falcons in the second round of the 2021 NFL draft.

== Early life ==
Grant was born and lived in Lumberton, Mississippi, until moving to Fort Walton Beach, Florida, when he was nine years old. He attended Choctawhatchee High School, where he ran track and played defensive back and wide receiver on the football team. Grant was rated a two star recruit by 247Sports and committed to play college football at Central Florida over offers from Georgia State, Tennessee-Chattanooga, the Citadel and Kennesaw State.

== College career ==
Grant redshirted his true freshman season and was in the defensive backfield rotation as a redshirt freshman. Grant was named a starter going into his redshirt sophomore season and was named first team All-American Athletic Conference (AAC) after leading the Knights with 109 tackles and six interceptions along with three forced fumbles and nine passes defended. He was again named first team all-conference after recording four tackles for loss, eight passes defended, one forced fumble and an interception the following season. As a redshirt senior, Grant was named first team All-AAC for a third straight season after leading the team with 72 tackles along with 3.5 tackles for a loss, three interceptions, six pass break-ups, two forced fumbles and two fumble recoveries. As a senior, he was a Jim Thorpe Award finalist and Bednarik Award semifinalist.

== Professional career ==
Pre-draft measurables
Height	Weight	Arm length	Hand span	Wingspan	40-yard dash	10-yard split	20-yard split	20-yard shuttle	Three-cone drill	Vertical jump	Broad jump	Bench press
5 ft 11 5/8 in (1.82 m)	197 lb (89 kg)	32 5/8 in (0.83 m)	9 3/8 in (0.24 m)	6 ft 5 5/8 in (1.97 m)	4.54 s	1.54 s	2.53 s	4.27 s	6.78 s	34.5 in (0.88 m)	10 ft 9 in (3.28 m)	12 reps
All values from Pro Day

=== Atlanta Falcons ===
Grant was selected in the second round with the 40th overall pick of the 2021 NFL draft by the Atlanta Falcons. He signed his four-year rookie contract with Atlanta on June 18, worth $8.3 million and a $3.4 million signing bonus.

After serving a backup role as a rookie, Grant was named the starting strong safety in 2022, starting all 17 games while finishing second on the team with 123 tackles, seven passes defensed, two interceptions and a forced fumble. He maintained his starting role in 2023, starting 15 of 17 games, finishing fourth on the team with 103 tackles, three sacks, six passes defensed, two forced fumbles, and an interception. He was relegated to a backup role in 2024 after losing the starting job to veteran Justin Simmons, playing primarily on special teams and rarely on defense.

=== San Francisco 49ers ===
On March 13, 2025, Grant signed a one-year contract with the San Francisco 49ers. He was released on August 28.

=== New England Patriots ===
On October 15, 2025, Grant was signed to the New England Patriots' practice squad.

== Personal life ==
Grant's uncle, Terry Grant, played running back at the University of Alabama and for the Hamilton Tiger-Cats of the Canadian Football League. At UCF, he studied sports and exercise science. As a freshman, he earned American All-Academic Team honors (2016–17).
