= Pearl River Central High School =

Coordinates: 30.6255°N 89.6541°W

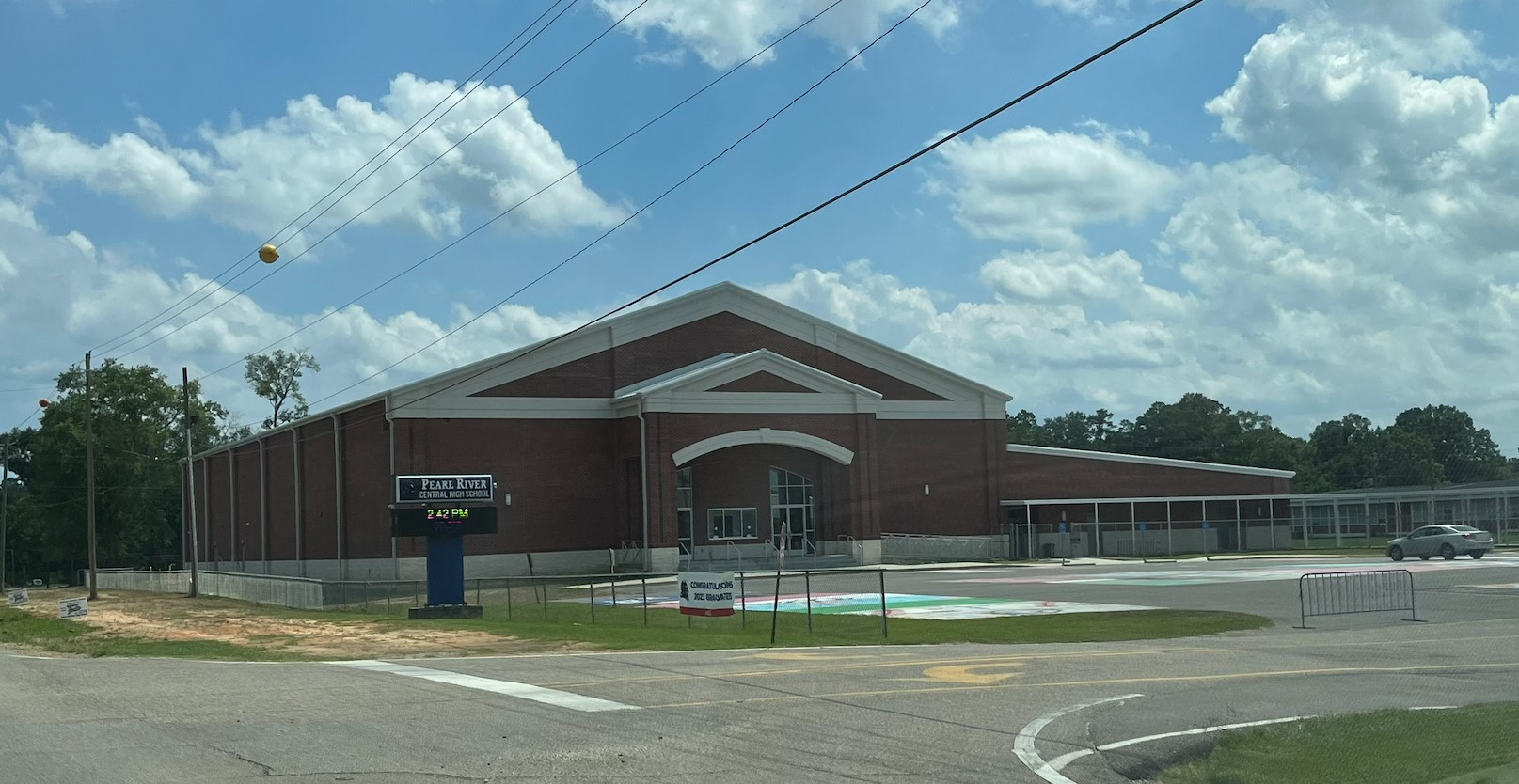

Location
- 7407 Highway 11; Carriere, Mississippi 39426

Information
- Type: Public high school
- School district: Pearl River County School District
- Principal: Crystal Penton
- Teaching staff: 61.30 (FTE)
- Grades: 9-12
- Gender: Co-educational
- Enrollment: 997 (2023-2024)
- Student to teacher ratio: 16.26
- Colors: Blue, white, and black
- Team name: Blue Devils
- Website: highschool.prc.k12.ms.us

Pearl River Central High School is a public high school in Carriere, Mississippi, United States. It is a part of the Pearl River County School District.

In addition to Carriere, the district (of which this is the only comprehensive high school) serves rural areas in south central Pearl River County. A small section of Picayune is in the limits of the school district. The majority of the Hide-A-Way Lake census-designated place is in the district.

== Athletics ==
The following sports are offered at Pearl River Central:

- Baseball
- Basketball
- Cheer
- Cross Country
- Dance
- Football
- Golf
- Soccer
- Softball
- Swim
- Track & Field
- Volleyball

=== State championships ===
Baseball

- 2017 Mississippi 5A State Champions

Dance

- 14x State Champions

== Demographics ==
89.1% of the student body at Pearl River Central identify as white, making up a majority of the student body with the minority enrollment being 10.9%.
