= Picayune School District =

School district in Mississippi

The Picayune School District is a public school district based in Picayune, Mississippi (USA).

The district is located in southwestern Pearl River County, where it includes almost all of Picayune, the Nicholson census-designated place, and a small section of the Hide-A-Way Lake CDP. It extends into a small portion of Hancock County.

The superintendent is Dean Shaw. The assistant superintendent is Esslinger.

== Schools ==
Secondary schools

- Picayune Memorial High School (9-12)
- Picayune Junior High School (7-8)

Elementary schools

- Nicholson Elementary School (K-6)
- Roseland Park Elementary School (K-6)
- South Side Upper Elementary School (3-6)
- South Side Lower Elementary School (K-2)
- West Side Elementary School (K-6)

Other Schools

- Early Head Start
- Center for Alternative Education

== Demographics ==
=== 2006-07 school year ===
There were a total of 3,808 students enrolled in the Picayune School District during the 2006–2007 school year. The gender makeup of the district was 49% female and 51% male. The racial makeup of the district was 30.17% African American, 66.44% White, 2.63% Hispanic, 0.42% Asian, and 0.34% Native American. 54.3% of the district's students were eligible to receive free lunch.

=== Previous school years ===
School Year	Enrollment	Gender Makeup		Racial Makeup				
School Year	Enrollment	Female	Male	Asian	African American	Hispanic	Native American	White
2005-06	3,757	49%	51%	0.29%	31.83%	1.84%	0.27%	65.77%
2004-05	3,764	49%	51%	0.32%	31.00%	1.97%	0.37%	66.34%
2003-04	3,814	49%	51%	0.26%	30.57%	1.60%	0.39%	67.17%
2002-03	3,770	49%	51%	0.21%	29.18%	1.33%	0.19%	69.10%

== Accountability statistics ==
	2006-07	2005-06	2004-05	2003-04	2002-03
District Accreditation Status	Accredited	Accredited	Accredited	Accredited	Accredited
School Performance Classifications
Level 5 (Superior Performing) Schools	0	0	1	2	0
Level 4 (Exemplary) Schools	1	1	2	2	3
Level 3 (Successful) Schools	5	5	3	2	3
Level 2 (Under Performing) Schools	0	0	0	0	0
Level 1 (Low Performing) Schools	0	0	0	0	0
Not Assigned	1	1	1	1	1

== See also ==
- List of school districts in Mississippi
