= Hide-A-Way Lake, Mississippi =

- Unincorporated community
- Location within Mississippi Location within the United States
- Coordinates: 30°33′54″N 89°38′25″W
- Country: United States
- State: Mississippi
- County: Pearl River

Area
  - Total: 1.825 sq mi (4.73 km^{2})
  - Land: 1.531 sq mi (3.97 km^{2})
  - Water: 0.294 sq mi (0.76 km^{2})
- Elevation: 102 ft (31 m)

Population (2020)
  - Total: 2,065
  - Density: 1,349/sq mi (520.8/km^{2})
- Time zone: UTC-6 (Central (CST))
  - Summer (DST): UTC-5 (CDT)
- Area codes: 601 & 769
- GNIS feature ID: 2652409

Hide-A-Way Lake is an unincorporated community and census-designated place in Pearl River County, Mississippi, United States. Its population was 2,065 as of the 2020 census.

== Geography ==
According to the U.S. Census Bureau, the community has an area of 1.825 square miles (4.73 km^{2}); 1.531 square miles (3.97 km^{2}) of its area is land, and 0.294 square miles (0.76 km^{2}) is water.

== Demographics ==
Historical population
Census	Pop.	Note	%±
2010	1,859		—
2020	2,065		11.1%
U.S. Decennial Census

Hide-A-Way Lake first appeared as a census designated place in the 2010 U.S. census.

=== Racial and ethnic composition ===
Hide-A-Way Lake CDP, Mississippi – Racial and ethnic composition Note: the US Census treats Hispanic/Latino as an ethnic category. This table excludes Latinos from the racial categories and assigns them to a separate category. Hispanics/Latinos may be of any race.
Race / Ethnicity (NH = Non-Hispanic)	Pop 2010	Pop 2020	% 2010	% 2020
White alone (NH)	1,750	1,836	94.14%	88.91%
Black or African American alone (NH)	23	25	1.24%	1.21%
Native American or Alaska Native alone (NH)	1	13	0.05%	0.63%
Asian alone (NH)	3	15	0.16%	0.73%
Native Hawaiian or Pacific Islander alone (NH)	0	0	0.00%	0.00%
Other race alone (NH)	0	5	0.00%	0.24%
Mixed race or Multiracial (NH)	19	89	1.02%	4.31%
Hispanic or Latino (any race)	63	82	3.39%	3.97%
Total	1,859	2,065	100.00%	100.00%

=== 2020 census ===
As of the 2020 census, Hide-A-Way Lake had a population of 2,065. The median age was 51.9 years. 20.6% of residents were under the age of 18 and 30.2% were 65 years of age or older. For every 100 females there were 90.7 males, and for every 100 females age 18 and over there were 83.7 males age 18 and over.

98.5% of residents lived in urban areas, while 1.5% lived in rural areas.

There were 847 households and 651 families in Hide-A-Way Lake, of which 28.6% had children under the age of 18 living in them. Of all households, 56.9% were married-couple households, 13.1% were households with a male householder and no spouse or partner present, and 24.6% were households with a female householder and no spouse or partner present. About 24.9% of all households were made up of individuals, and 16.0% had someone living alone who was 65 years of age or older.

There were 952 housing units, of which 11.0% were vacant. The homeowner vacancy rate was 2.3% and the rental vacancy rate was 11.1%.

== Education ==
Almost all of this CDP is in the Pearl River County School District. A very small portion is in the Picayune School District.

The respective comprehensive public high schools are: Pearl River Central High School and Picayune Memorial High School.
