= Picayune Municipal Airport =

- IATA: none; ICAO: KMJD; FAA LID: MJD

Summary
- Airport type: Public
- Owner: Panola County
- Serves: Picayune, Mississippi
- Elevation AMSL: 55.3 ft / 16.9 m
- Coordinates: 30°29′14.9″N 089°39′04.3″W
- Interactive map of Picayune Municipal Airport

Runways
Direction	Length		Surface
Direction	ft	m	Surface
18/36	5,000	1,524	Asphalt
- Source: Federal Aviation Administration

Picayune Municipal Airport (ICAO: MJD, FAA LID: KMJD) is a public-use airport located in the town of Picayune, Mississippi. It is located near Interstate 59. The National Plan of Integrated Airport Systems for 2011–2015 categorized it as a general aviation facility.

== Geography ==
The airport is located 2 mi (3.2 km) from the town of Picayune, and 50 mi (80 km) from the city of New Orleans.

== Facilities ==
The airport is located at an elevation of 55.3 ft (16.9 m). It has one runway: 18/36, which is 5000 x 75 ft. (1524 x 23 m). It has no control tower. The airport employs roughly 200 employees. In 2025, the airport received a $2.5 million grant to reconstruct the airport's sole runway.
