= Zac Houston =

American baseball player (born 1994)

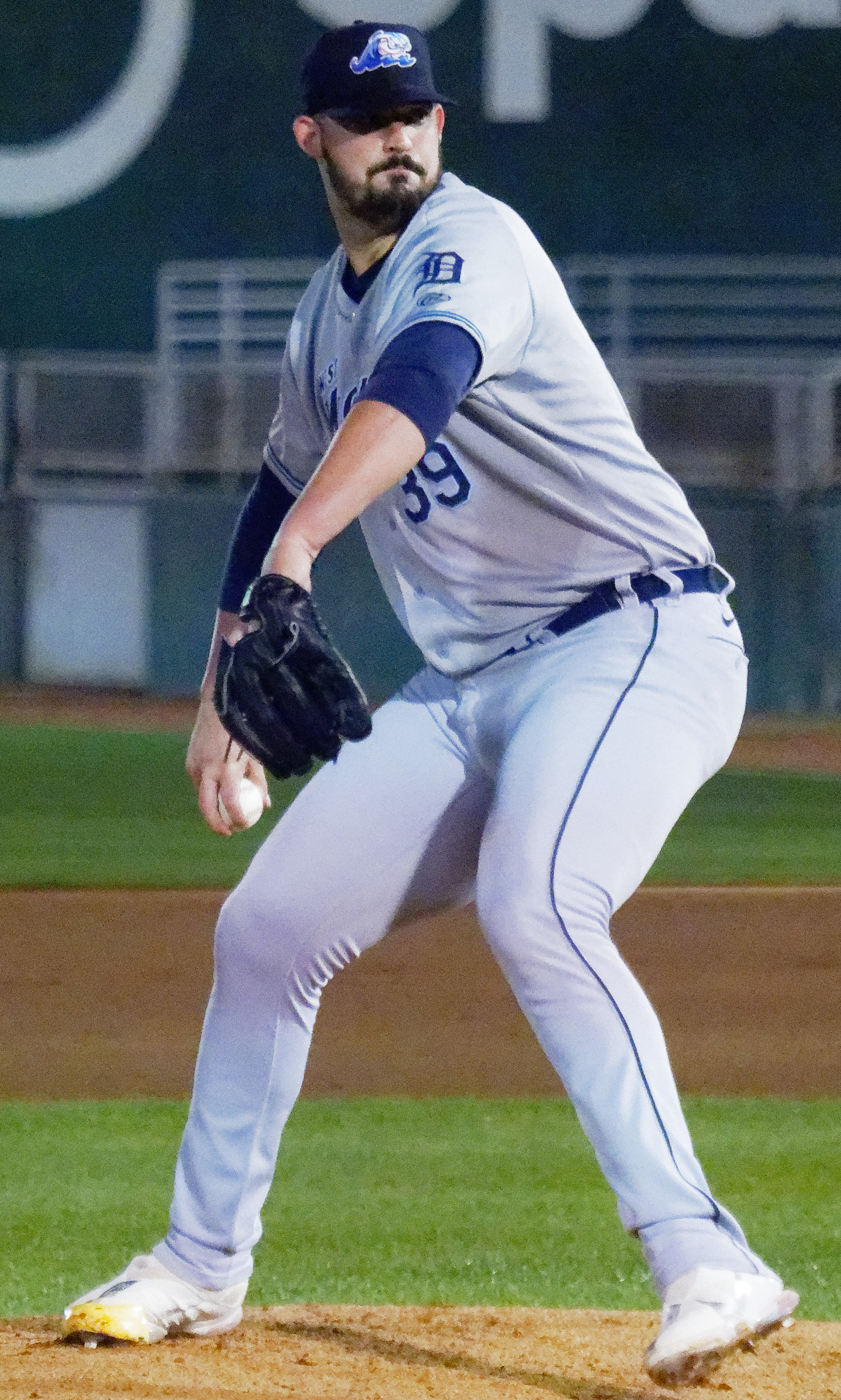
- Houston with the West Michigan Whitecaps in 2021
- Pitcher
- Born: November 30, 1994 (age 31); Slidell, Louisiana, U.S.
- Bats: Right Throws: Right
- Stats at Baseball Reference

Zachary Matthew Houston (born November 30, 1994) is an American former professional baseball pitcher.

== Career ==
=== Amateur career ===
Houston attended Poplarville High School in Poplarville, Mississippi, and Mississippi State University, where he played college baseball for the Mississippi State Bulldogs. In 2015, he played collegiate summer baseball with the Wareham Gatemen of the Cape Cod Baseball League.

=== Detroit Tigers ===
Houston was drafted by the Detroit Tigers in the 11th round, with the 325th overall selection, of the 2016 Major League Baseball draft.

Houston signed with Detroit and spent his first professional season with the Connecticut Tigers and West Michigan Whitecaps, going a combined 2–0 with a 0.30 ERA in 20 relief appearances between both teams. He pitched 2017 with West Michigan and the Lakeland Flying Tigers where he pitched to a combined 0–1 record and 2.17 ERA in 58 total relief innings pitched. After the season he played in the Arizona Fall League. He started 2018 with the Erie SeaWolves and was promoted to the Toledo Mud Hens during the season. Houston finished the year with a 1.63 ERA across 46 games for both affiliates.

Houston split the 2019 season back with Erie and Toledo, accumulating a 7–2 record and 4.53 ERA with 68 strikeouts across 40 total games. He did not play in a game in 2020 due to the cancellation of the minor league season because of the COVID-19 pandemic. Houston returned to action in 2021, appearing in only 7 games for West Michigan and the rookie–level Florida Complex League Tigers. In 2022, he once again played for Erie and Toledo, accumulating a 2–7 record and 5.47 ERA with 88 strikeouts and 4 saves across 48 contests. Houston elected free agency following the season on November 10, 2022.

=== New York Yankees ===
On December 4, 2022, Houston signed a minor league deal with the New York Yankees. He split the 2023 season between the Double–A Somerset Patriots and Triple–A Scranton/Wilkes-Barre RailRiders. In 37 games between the two affiliates, Houston recorded a cumulative 4.43 ERA with 73 strikeouts and 2 saves across 42 2/3 innings of work. He elected free agency following the season on November 6, 2023.

=== Philadelphia Phillies ===
On December 13, 2023, Houston signed a minor league contract with the Tampa Bay Rays organization. On March 23, 2024, Houston was traded to the Philadelphia Phillies in exchange for cash considerations. In 14 appearances for the Triple–A Lehigh Valley IronPigs, he struggled to a 10.29 ERA with 19 strikeouts across 14 innings pitched. On July 3, Houston was released by the Phillies organization.
