= Michael Holloway Perronne =

American writer

- Born: 1974 (age 51–52); Picayune, Mississippi, U.S.
- Education: University of Southern Mississippi (BA); University of New Orleans (MFA)
- Occupations: Author, Screenwriter
- Parent(s): Mike Perronne; Barbara Marie Perronne
- Website: www.michaelhperronne.com

Michael Holloway Perronne (born 1974) is an American author. His novels include: A Time Before Me, Men Can Do Romance, Falling Into Me, Embrace the Rain, A Time Before Us, and Gardens of Hope.

Perronne received a great deal of publicity after sending a copy of his novel, A Time Before Me, to Alabama state lawmaker Gerald Allen who proposed that all books mentioning gay content should be banned. Allen was quoted saying, "I guess we dig a big hole and dump them in and bury them."

In response, Perronne said, "If Mr. Allen is determined to bury such great works as The Color Purple, The Picture of Dorian Gray, and Brideshead Revisited, then I would be honored to have my own work buried with such classics." The controversy led to Perronne making appearances on national television and mentions in national gay newsmagazines.

His debut novel, "A Time Before Me" won the Bronze Award, ForeWord Magazine's 2006 Book of the Year Award in the Gay/Lesbian fiction category.

Perronne is openly gay.

Some of his later works, including Falling Into Me and A Time Before Us, dealt with common issues gay men in their thirties face with growing older. Embrace the Rain examined cultural clashes between ethnic groups in post-Hurricane Katrina in Perronne's native coastal Mississippi. Gardens of Hope, his first historical novel, takes place in the backdrop of the World War II Japanese-American internment camp Manzanar.

in 2019, Michael's script for the TV movie Deadly Vengeance was shot and produced by Titan Global Entertainment and Marvista Entertainment starring Gina Holden, Mitchell Hoog, Jessica Belkin and David Lipper.

As of 2023, he has also written the scripts for seven additional TV movies that have aired on Lifetime, LMN, UpTV, and streaming on Amazon Prime. Titles include: Saving My Daughter; Here Kills the Bride; Love, Game, Match; The Nature of Romance; Trapped With my Husband; and Don't Sell My Baby. Upcoming premieres include: The Perfect In-Laws, directed by Emmy-nominated actress Ashley Jones, on LMN on Nov. 20, 2023 and My Two Husbands set to debut on June 20, 2024, also on LMN.Perronne's IMDB

== Personal life ==
Perronne was born and raised in Picayune, Mississippi, the son of Mike and Barbara Marie Perronne. He received a BA in Film from the University of Southern Mississippi and an MFA in Drama and Communications from the University of New Orleans. For a few years he worked as a production assistant in television and film, in both New Orleans and Los Angeles, on such projects as the television series The Big Easy and the television movies Rag and Bone and Introducing Dorothy Dandridge.

Following that, he worked as the Conference Services Coordinator for NATPE. He did script reading and analysis for the Los Angeles Film Festival and the Los Angeles Film Collaborative.
