= John Henry Prince =

American baseball player (born 1914)

- Third baseman
- Born: November 15, 1914; Lumberton, Mississippi, U.S.
- Batted: Right Threw: Right

Negro league baseball debut
- 1936, for the Chicago American Giants

Last appearance
- 1936, for the Chicago American Giants

Teams
- Chicago American Giants (1936)

John Henry Prince (born November 15, 1914, date of death unknown) was an American Negro league third baseman who played in the 1930s.

A native of Lumberton, Mississippi, Prince played for the Chicago American Giants in 1936. In nine recorded games, he posted five hits in 28 plate appearances.
