= Nicholson, Mississippi =

- Census-designated place & Unincorporated community
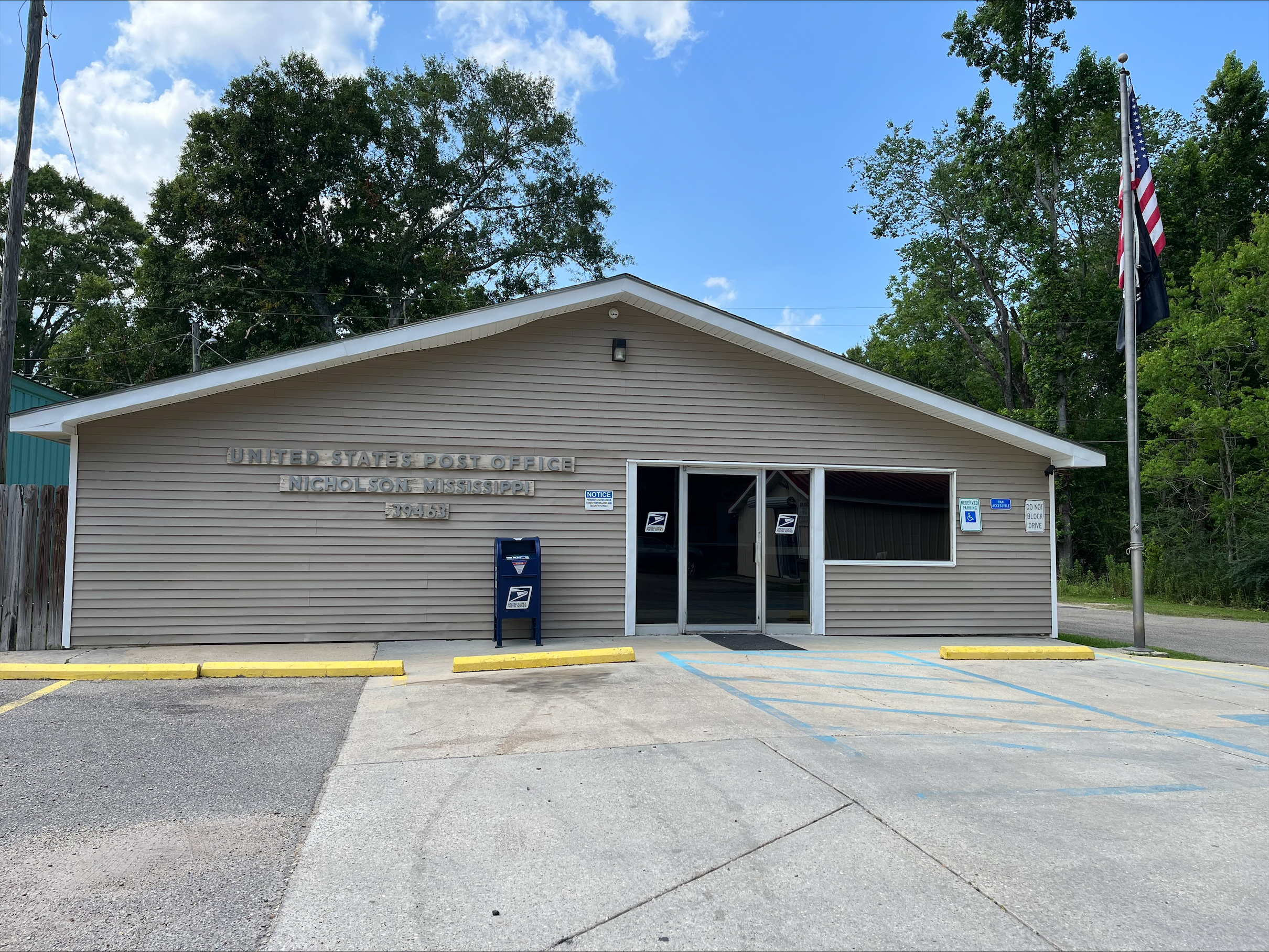
- Nicholson Post Office

- Location within Mississippi Location within the United States
- Coordinates: 30°28′38″N 89°41′37″W
- Country: United States
- State: Mississippi
- County: Pearl River

Area
  - Total: 6.25 sq mi (16.20 km^{2})
  - Land: 6.04 sq mi (15.65 km^{2})
  - Water: 0.21 sq mi (0.55 km^{2})
- Elevation: 49 ft (15 m)

Population (2020)
  - Total: 2,833
  - Density: 468.9/sq mi (181.04/km^{2})
- Time zone: UTC-6 (Central (CST))
  - Summer (DST): UTC-5 (CDT)
- ZIP code: 39463
- Area codes: 601 & 769
- GNIS feature ID: 674919

Nicholson is an unincorporated community and census-designated place (CDP) in Pearl River County, Mississippi, United States. As of the 2020 census, its population was 2,833. Its ZIP code is 39463.

== Demographics ==
Historical population
Census	Pop.	Note	%±
2020	2,833		—
U.S. Decennial Census

Nicholson first appeared as a census designated place in the 2010 U.S. census.

=== 2020 census ===
As of the 2020 census, Nicholson had a population of 2,833. There were 1,181 households and 764 families residing in the CDP.

The median age was 39.0 years. 24.1% of residents were under the age of 18 and 13.6% of residents were 65 years of age or older. For every 100 females there were 105.4 males, and for every 100 females age 18 and over there were 100.6 males age 18 and over.

89.0% of residents lived in urban areas, while 11.0% lived in rural areas.

29.9% of households had children under the age of 18 living in them. Of all households, 31.2% were married-couple households, 27.8% were households with a male householder and no spouse or partner present, and 31.6% were households with a female householder and no spouse or partner present. About 35.3% of all households were made up of individuals and 11.8% had someone living alone who was 65 years of age or older.

There were 1,371 housing units, of which 13.9% were vacant. The homeowner vacancy rate was 0.9% and the rental vacancy rate was 8.9%.

Nicholson racial composition as of 2020 (NH = Non-Hispanic) (Note: Note: the US Census treats Hispanic/Latino as an ethnic category. This table excludes Latinos from the racial categories and assigns them to a separate category. Hispanics/Latinos can be of any race.)
Race	Number	Percentage
White (NH)	1,947	68.73%
Black or African American (NH)	363	12.81%
Native American or Alaska Native (NH)	9	0.32%
Asian (NH)	7	0.25%
Some Other Race (NH)	14	0.49%
Mixed/Multi-Racial (NH)	198	6.99%
Hispanic or Latino	295	10.41%
Total	2,833	

== Education ==
It is in the Picayune School District, which operates Picayune Memorial High School.
