= Poplarville School District =

School district in Mississippi

Address
- 302 S Julia St Poplarville, Pearl River County, MS, 39470; United States

District information
- Type: Public
- Motto: "Home of the Hornets" and "Where students come to THRIVE!"
- Grades: K-12

Students and staff
- Colors: Green and Gold

Other information
- Website: www.poplarvilleschools.org

The Poplarville School District is a public school district based in Poplarville, Mississippi (USA). In addition to Poplarville, the district serves a large portion of rural Pearl River County.

== History ==
Initially the Lumberton Public School District was to be dissolved as of July 1, 2019, with portions going to the Lamar County School District and the Poplarville Separate School District. Lumberton was required to close due to Governor of Mississippi Phil Bryant signing Senate Bill 2500, which required consolidation, in 2016. By 2018 the Lumberton and Lamar county districts chose to do a voluntary consolidation, effective July 1, 2018, where the entirety of Lumberton students would continue going to Lumberton school buildings operated by the Lamar district. Poplarville's school board as well as the Pearl River County Board sued to stop the voluntary merger so the school district could obtain a portion of the Lumberton district, but the lawsuit was dismissed.

== Schools ==
The Poplarville School System's mascot is a hornet and the school colors are green and gold. Poplarville School District includes the following schools:

- Poplarville High School (Grades 9–12)
- Poplarville Middle School (Grades 6–8)
- Poplarville Upper Elementary School (Grades 3–5)
- Poplarville Lower Elementary School (Grades K-2)

Jonathan Will became Superintendent of Education for the Poplarville School District following the retirement of Supt. Carl Merritt. The district is served by a School Board of five appointed members. Three members are appointed from the Poplarville area supervisor districts and the other two are appointed by the Poplarville Board of Aldermen.

== Athletics ==
Poplarville High School is home to the Poplarville Hornets. The school has football, basketball, baseball, soccer, golf, tennis, softball, and volleyball.

== Demographics ==
=== 2006-07 school year ===
There were a total of 2,193 students enrolled in the Poplarville School District during the 2006–2007 school year. The gender makeup of the district was 47% female and 53% male. The racial makeup of the district was 13.86% African American, 85.09% White, 0.55% Hispanic, 0.32% Asian, and 0.18% Native American. 55.3% of the district's students were eligible to receive free lunch.

=== Previous school years ===
School Year	Enrollment	Gender Makeup		Racial Makeup				
School Year	Enrollment	Female	Male	Asian	African American	Hispanic	Native American	White
2005-06	2,083	47%	53%	0.33%	12.96%	0.38%	0.10%	86.22%
2004-05	2,090	48%	52%	0.38%	13.06%	0.48%	0.05%	86.03%
2003-04	2,039	49%	51%	0.39%	13.19%	0.34%	0.10%	85.97%
2002-03	2,029	49%	51%	0.15%	11.78%	0.39%	0.10%	87.58%

== Accountability statistics ==
	2006-07	2005-06	2004-05	2003-04	2002-03
District Accreditation Status	Accredited	Accredited	Accredited	Accredited	Accredited
School Performance Classifications
Level 5 (Superior Performing) Schools	1	1	1	2	1
Level 4 (Exemplary) Schools	2	2	2	0	1
Level 3 (Successful) Schools	0	0	0	1	1
Level 2 (Under Performing) Schools	0	0	0	0	0
Level 1 (Low Performing) Schools	0	0	0	0	0
Not Assigned	1	1	1	1	1

== Awards ==
Poplarville High School (PHS) was awarded by U.S. News and World Report a bronze medal and ranked as one of the nation’s highest performing schools. Poplarville School District was recently named an "A" rated district by national testing standards. It is one of only fifteen "A" rated districts in the state.

== See also ==
- List of school districts in Mississippi
