= Plane Walker =

First edition (publ. Gehenna Publishing House)

Plane Walker is a 2016 science fiction horror novel by C. P. Dunphey. It is the first in a series of three books titled the Manus Dei Trilogy. The novel follows protagonist Lazarus as he embarks on a mission to find his missing daughter, Elisha. She disappeared during a freak accident that erased most of Lazarus's memory of and leading up to the event. He uses a technology called the Manus Dei System that allows him to explore the afterlife in search of his memories he has forgotten in life. The journeys end up taking him to a desolate moon, called Heiron, where his daughter was last seen.

== Background ==
The first draft of Plane Walker was written in 2012, published independently titled as Lazarus. Dunphey would go on to express his disappointment with the original draft, considering it rushed and lacking of patience within the narrative. Four years later, and after extensive professional edits, the book would be re-released as Plane Walker.

== Plot ==
Set very far in the future, Plane Walker takes place in a universe where technology and religion are connected in more ways than one. A central point to all of the events in the novel is the Manus Dei System, created by scientist Hugh Zephyre. The mechanism can take one into the afterlife and back, visually recording the events as seen through the eyes of the traveler's soul.

The novel follows Lazarus, a man with a dark past who lost his daughter in a freak accident. He finds the last Manus Dei System in the galaxy on the Venter Bestiae, a ship commanded by Jonah, Dinah, and Ezra. After traveling into the afterlife 37 times, Lazarus finally uncovers a memory of where his daughter was before the accident. The crew then embark on a mission to Heiron, a moon that has been crippled and destroyed by nuclear fallout, to rescue Lazarus's daughter, Elisha.

== Reception ==
Science fiction magazine Amazing Stories called the novel "slow to start" and said it "focused too much on minutia" while praising the technical writing of the work.
