= Percy Bailey =

- Starting pitcher
- Born: November 15, 1904; Lumberton, Mississippi, U.S.
- Died: October 13, 1981 (aged 76)
- Batted: Unknown Threw: Right

Negro league baseball debut
- 1933, for the Nashville Elite Giants

Last appearance
- 1934, for the Chicago American Giants
- Stats at Baseball Reference

Teams
- Nashville Elite Giants (1933); Indianapolis ABCs/Detroit Stars (1933); Chicago American Giants (1934)

Career highlights and awards
- 1× All-Star (1933)

Percy Charles Bailey (November 15, 1904 – October 13, 1981) was an American professional baseball starting pitcher in the Negro leagues. He played with the Nashville Elite Giants and Indianapolis ABCs/Detroit Stars in 1933 and the Chicago American Giants in 1934.

== Early life and baseball career ==
Bailey was born in Lumberton, Mississippi in 1904. He graduated both high school and college at Alcorn State University. He joined the Nashville Elite Giants in during spring training in New Orleans in 1933. He secured a spot in the Elite Giants' pitching rotation before the regular season began after he allowed only four hits in an exhibition game against the New Orleans Crescent Stars in late April.

By May, he had joined the Indianapolis ABCs/Detroit Stars. In 10 documented major league games between the two clubs, he compiled a 4-5 win–loss record and 2.03 earned run average and was named to the 1933 East–West All-Star Game.

In 1934, Bailey joined the Chicago American Giants. In nine major league games with Chicago, he finished with a 7.78 ERA in 39.1 innings pitched.

== Post-baseball life ==
Bailey worked as a coach, science teacher and assistant principal at Eureka High School in Hattiesburg, Mississippi. He also served as principal of Sumrall High School in Sumrall from 1931 to 1937 and at Grace Love Elementary School in Forrest County from 1941 to 1969 Bailey also taught and coached at other schools in the Hattiesburg area. He was also named to the Alcorn State University Baseball Hall of Fame.
