= Terry Grant (gridiron football) =

American gridiron football player (born 1987)

No. 21
- Position: Running back

Personal information
- Born: March 3, 1987 (age 39); Lumberton, Mississippi, U.S.
- Listed height: 5 ft 9 in (1.75 m)
- Listed weight: 190 lb (86 kg)

Career information
- College: University of Alabama

Career history
- 2011: Hamilton Tiger-Cats
- Stats at CFL.ca (archive)

Terry O'Neal Grant (born March 3, 1987) is an American former professional football player.

He was signed by the Hamilton Tiger-Cats as an undrafted free agent on May 30, 2011. In his first season with the Tiger-Cats he played in six games, rushing for 151 yards on 20 carries and catching 6 passes for 87 yards.

== College career ==
Grant played for the University of Alabama Crimson Tide from 2006 to 2009. His best season was 2007, when he rushed for 891 yards and 8 touchdowns. He also caught 26 passes for 176 yards and a touchdown that year. In subsequent years a series of injuries limited his playing time and he was unable to regain his position as a starter.

== High school career ==
Grant scored 113 touchdowns for Lumberton High School. He amassed 2,700 yards and 36 touchdowns in his senior year and was named Mississippi Mister Football. In 2015, he pled guilty to charges of possessing cocaine.
