= Carriere, Mississippi =

- Unincorporated community
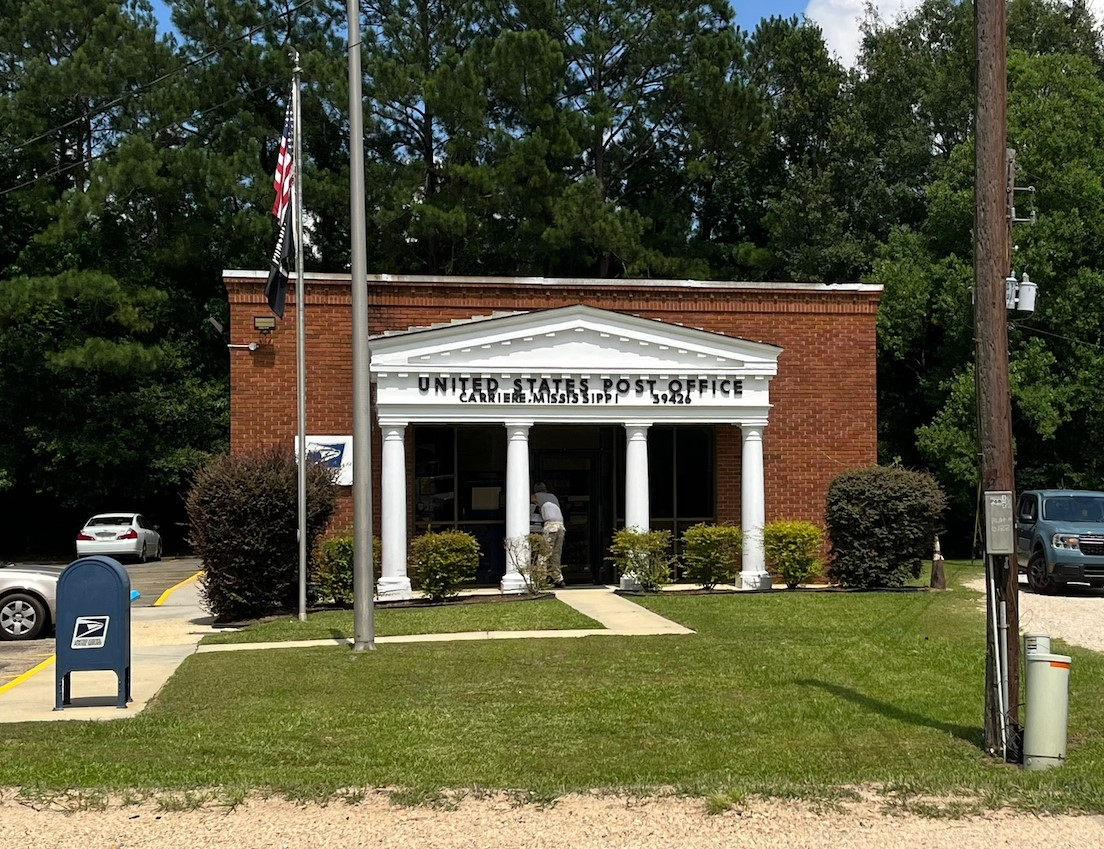
- Carriere Post Office

- Location within Mississippi Location within the United States
- Coordinates: 30°37′1″N 89°39′9″W
- Country: United States
- State: Mississippi
- County: Pearl River
- Elevation: 164 ft (50 m)
- Time zone: UTC-6 (Central (CST))
  - Summer (DST): UTC-5 (CDT)
- ZIP code: 39426
- Area codes: 601 & 769
- GNIS feature ID: 668094

Carriere, (also known as Highland or Lacey), is an unincorporated community in Pearl River County, Mississippi, United States. The zip code is 39426.

== History ==
Carriere was originally known as Highland. The name was then changed to Lacey, and finally Carriere in 1903. Carriere is likely named from Emile L. Carriere, who was the president of the Citizen's Bank of New Orleans and served on the board of directors for the New Orleans and Northeastern Railroad, which operated a depot in Carriere. The community was incorporated on June 17, 1904 and unincorporated at an unknown date.

In 1906, Carriere was home to the Bank of Carriere and had an estimated population of 450.

During World War II, a German prisoner-of-war camp operated in Carriere. Known as Hillcrest Farm, prisoners grew produce and operated a dairy farm.

Carriere was once home to multiple general stores, sawmills, and two lumber companies.

== Education ==
Pearl River Central High School is located in Carriere and serves grades 9-12.

== Notable people ==
- Hayden Dunhurst, professional baseball catcher
- John Lumpkin, head football coach of the Mississippi State Teachers for the 1930 season
