= Poplarville, Mississippi =

- City
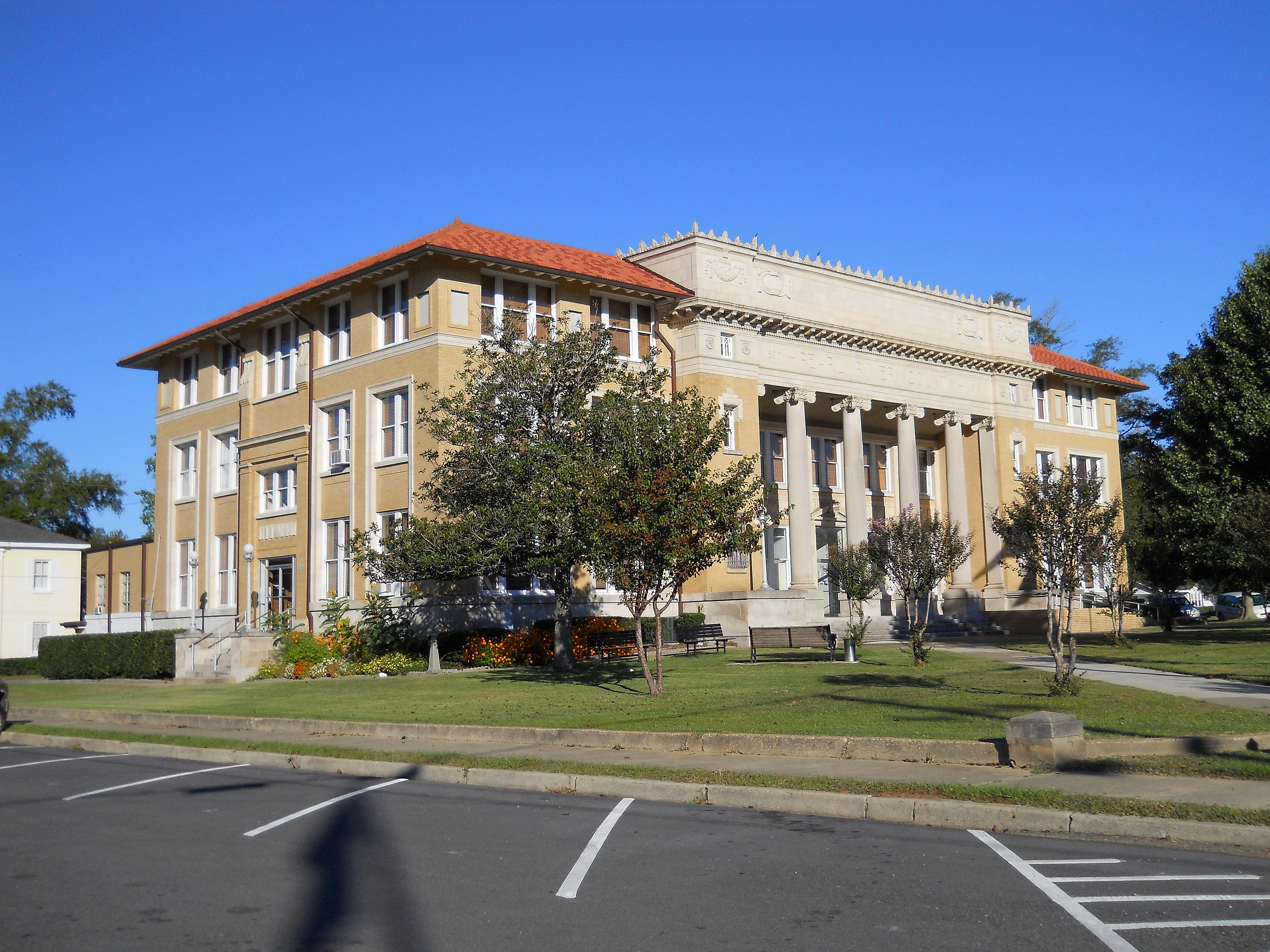
- Pearl River County Courthouse
- Nicknames: P-Ville, PopVegas, Blueberry Capital of Mississippi,
- Location of Poplarville, Mississippi

- Location in the United States
- Coordinates: 30°50′26″N 89°32′2″W
- Country: United States
- State: Mississippi
- County: Pearl River

Government
  - Mayor: Louise Smith

Area
  - Total: 5.42 sq mi (14.04 km^{2})
  - Land: 5.41 sq mi (14.01 km^{2})
  - Water: 0.012 sq mi (0.03 km^{2})
- Elevation: 318 ft (97 m)

Population (2020)
  - Total: 2,833
  - Density: 523.9/sq mi (202.26/km^{2})
- Time zone: UTC-6 (Central (CST))
  - Summer (DST): UTC-5 (CDT)
- ZIP code: 39470
- Area code: 601/769
- FIPS code: 28-59480
- GNIS feature ID: 0676247
- Website: www.poplarvillems.gov

Poplarville is a city and the county seat of Pearl River County, Mississippi, United States. As of the 2020 censusPoplarville had a population of 2,833.

Poplarville hosts the annual Blueberry Jubilee (a festival that includes rides, artists, craft vendors and rodeos), and is home to Pearl River Community College (Mississippi's first Community College.)

== History ==
Pearl County was formed in 1872. The county courthouse at the time burnt down not long after the county was formed. With the records destroyed by the fire, substandard tax rolls, and the poor numbers of residents the county was abolished in 1878.

In the year 1890 the new Pearl River county was formed by an act of the Legislature that appropriated lands from both Hancock county to the south and Marion county to the north. Just prior to the establishment of the new county a railroad was built through the area (the New Orleans and Northeastern), which helped to grow the area's population.

Poplarville was designated the county's seat of the new government, and the city was named after "Poplar" Jim Smith who, owned much of the land in the area.

The city was incorporated several years before the new county was established, March 4th, 1886. Poplarville had only 236 residents as of the 1890 census, but by 1900 the population soared over 325% to 990 residents!

The first Pearl River Courthouse was built in Poplarville in 1892. It later housed the Pearl River County Hospital. The city's first school opened the same year which saved parents from having to bring their children to Lumberton, almost 25 miles north of Poplarville.

In 1907, Theodore Gilmore Bilbo was elected for Mississippi Senate. He served 12 years and was very progressive. T.G. Bilbo was of big importance to Mississippi's educational programs, and established Pearl River County Agricultural High School in Poplarville

Pearl River Community College was founded in 1909 (as Pearl River County Agricultural High School) by T.M. Kelly. In 1921 PRCC became what it is today after J.A. Huff by turning it into the first 2-year public institution in Mississippi.

Pearl River County continued growing, prosperity followed. Its citizens decided that the original county courthouse was inadequate and in 1918, construction of the 2nd courthouse began. The $130,000 cost was immense but the building was completed and occupied in June 1920.

Around World War I Poplarville had many sawmills which proved to be highly profitable, families also came from Picayune and produced various farm products.

After World War II cow products (such as dairy and beef) became an important part of the town's economy.

On August 29, 2005, Hurricane Katrina inflicted damage on Poplarville, with the storm's most powerful, unofficially recorded gust of wind reported at Pearl River Community College, of 135 mph (217 km/h). On September 2, 2005, Ohio Army National Guard arrived in Poplarville to assist with the recovery. Initial efforts were the security of banks, pharmacies and gas stations as well as responses to rural emergencies. The unit stayed for three weeks ultimately checking on every family and structure in the county. On September 5, 2005, George W. Bush, Laura Bush, and Governor Haley Barbour visited Pearl River Community College to view the aftermath of Hurricane Katrina.

Pearl River County is a dry county but municipalities control whether to stay dry or not. On March 25, 2014, Poplarville citizens voted to allow for beer and low alcohol percentage wine sales. The final vote count was 361 votes for the measure and 149 against.

=== Notable structures to Poplarville (still standing) ===
Shaw homestead (oldest house in the town) - c.1885

Old Pearl River courthouse (first Pearl River courthouse, Mississippi landmark) - c.1892

District Attorney's Office - (used as library, chancery clerk's, and sheriff's office over the past century) c.1903

Confederate/WWI monument (Mississippi landmark) - c.1926

First Baptist Church - (oldest church community in the town) c.1930

U.S. Post office - (built by FWA, and distinct layout from other similar works) c.1941

== Geography ==
According to the United States Census Bureau, the city has a total area of 3.9 square miles (10 km^{2}), of which, 3.8 square miles (9.8 km^{2}) of it is land and 0.04 square miles (0.10 km^{2}) of it (0.52%) is water.

=== Climate ===
Poplarville has a humid subtropical climate (Köppen: Cfa) with short spring times followed by hot summers and short, mild winters. Snowfall is a rarity, usually once every 10 years.

Climate data for Poplarville Experiment Station, Mississippi (1991–2020 normals, extremes 1896–1905, 1919–present)
Month	Jan	Feb	Mar	Apr	May	Jun	Jul	Aug	Sep	Oct	Nov	Dec	Year
Record high °F (°C)	84 (29)	87 (31)	89 (32)	98 (37)	101 (38)	104 (40)	105 (41)	105 (41)	103 (39)	97 (36)	92 (33)	85 (29)	105 (41)
Mean maximum °F (°C)	75.3 (24.1)	77.3 (25.2)	82.9 (28.3)	86.5 (30.3)	92.3 (33.5)	95.9 (35.5)	97.1 (36.2)	97.1 (36.2)	89.6 (32.0)	89.6 (32.0)	81.4 (27.4)	76.4 (24.7)	98.4 (36.9)
Mean daily maximum °F (°C)	59.3 (15.2)	63.4 (17.4)	70.3 (21.3)	76.8 (24.9)	84.1 (28.9)	89.4 (31.9)	90.8 (32.7)	91.0 (32.8)	87.0 (30.6)	78.8 (26.0)	68.3 (20.2)	61.2 (16.2)	76.7 (24.8)
Daily mean °F (°C)	49.0 (9.4)	52.6 (11.4)	59.1 (15.1)	65.4 (18.6)	73.1 (22.8)	79.0 (26.1)	80.8 (27.1)	80.7 (27.1)	76.6 (24.8)	67.4 (19.7)	57.2 (14.0)	51.0 (10.6)	66.0 (18.9)
Mean daily minimum °F (°C)	38.6 (3.7)	41.8 (5.4)	47.9 (8.8)	54.1 (12.3)	62.2 (16.8)	68.7 (20.4)	70.7 (21.5)	70.4 (21.3)	66.3 (19.1)	56.0 (13.3)	46.1 (7.8)	40.7 (4.8)	55.3 (12.9)
Mean minimum °F (°C)	21.1 (−6.1)	26.3 (−3.2)	30.4 (−0.9)	38.8 (3.8)	50.0 (10.0)	62.3 (16.8)	66.6 (19.2)	65.9 (18.8)	55.9 (13.3)	40.0 (4.4)	30.6 (−0.8)	26.2 (−3.2)	19.8 (−6.8)
Record low °F (°C)	3 (−16)	10 (−12)	15 (−9)	30 (−1)	37 (3)	49 (9)	58 (14)	57 (14)	39 (4)	28 (−2)	20 (−7)	5 (−15)	3 (−16)
Average precipitation inches (mm)	5.73 (146)	5.27 (134)	5.52 (140)	5.48 (139)	5.28 (134)	6.41 (163)	6.94 (176)	5.99 (152)	4.82 (122)	4.04 (103)	4.05 (103)	5.45 (138)	64.98 (1,650)
Average snowfall inches (cm)	0.0 (0.0)	0.0 (0.0)	0.3 (0.76)	0.0 (0.0)	0.0 (0.0)	0.0 (0.0)	0.0 (0.0)	0.0 (0.0)	0.0 (0.0)	0.0 (0.0)	0.0 (0.0)	0.0 (0.0)	0.3 (0.76)
Average precipitation days (≥ 0.01 in)	11.9	10.4	9.4	8.3	8.0	12.1	13.7	11.7	8.7	7.1	8.3	10.7	120.3
Average snowy days (≥ 0.1 in)	0.0	0.0	0.0	0.0	0.0	0.0	0.0	0.0	0.0	0.0	0.0	0.0	0.0
Source: NOAA

== Demographics ==
Historical population
Census	Pop.	Note	%±
1890	232		—
1900	990		326.7%
1910	1,272		28.5%
1920	1,290		1.4%
1930	1,498		16.1%
1940	1,664		11.1%
1950	1,852		11.3%
1960	2,136		15.3%
1970	2,312		8.2%
1980	2,562		10.8%
1990	2,561		0.0%
2000	2,601		1.6%
2010	2,894		11.3%
2020	2,833		−2.1%
U.S. Decennial Census

=== 2020 census ===
Poplarville racial composition
Race	Num.	Perc.
White (non-Hispanic)	1,857	65.55%
Black or African American (non-Hispanic)	774	27.32%
Native American	8	0.28%
Asian	22	0.78%
Other/Mixed	101	3.57%
Hispanic or Latino	71	2.51%

As of the 2020 census, Poplarville had a population of 2,833. The median age was 25.9 years. 17.1% of residents were under the age of 18 and 15.6% of residents were 65 years of age or older. For every 100 females there were 87.0 males, and for every 100 females age 18 and over there were 84.7 males age 18 and over.

According to the census, all residents lived in rural areas.

There were 790 households in Poplarville, of which 34.6% had children under the age of 18 living in them. Of all households, 39.4% were married-couple households, 15.1% were households with a male householder and no spouse or partner present, and 39.7% were households with a female householder and no spouse or partner present. About 30.4% of all households were made up of individuals and 15.9% had someone living alone who was 65 years of age or older.

There were 961 housing units, of which 17.8% were vacant. The homeowner vacancy rate was 2.5% and the rental vacancy rate was 12.0%.

=== 2000 census ===
As of the census of 2000, there were 2,601 people, 852 households, and 558 families residing in the city. The population density was 676.5 inhabitants per square mile (261.2/km^{2}). There were 936 housing units at an average density of 243.4 per square mile (94.0/km^{2}). The racial makeup of the city was 74.32% White, 23.95% African American, 0.50% Asian, 0.15% Native American, 0.12% Pacific Islander, 0.15% from other races, and 0.81% from two or more races. Hispanic or Latino of any race were 0.65% of the population.

There were 852 households, out of which 32.5% had children under the age of 18 living with them, 42.6% were married couples living together, 19.0% had a female householder with no husband present, and 34.4% were non-families. 30.5% of all households were made up of individuals, and 15.3% had someone living alone who was 65 years of age or older. The average household size was 2.37 and the average family size was 2.99.

In the city, the population was spread out, with 21.6% under the age of 18, 20.8% from 18 to 24, 22.3% from 25 to 44, 18.2% from 45 to 64, and 17.0% who were 65 years of age or older. The median age was 32 years. For every 100 females, there were 84.9 males. For every 100 females age 18 and over, there were 81.0 males.

The median income for a household in the city was $26,417, and the median income for a family was $32,339. Males had a median income of $35,250 versus $21,667 for females. The per capita income for the city was $12,833. About 20.8% of families and 25.3% of the population were below the poverty line, including 38.8% of those under age 18 and 17.5% of those age 65 or over.

== Arts and culture ==
The Blueberry Jubilee takes place every second Saturday of June, and is an important part of Poplarville culture. The festival has hundreds of vendors in many home made or professional crafts, food, etc. There are also baby races, 1k run, 5k run, puppy pageant, water slides, and more. The main part of the Blueberry Jubilee is- the tremendous amount of blueberries at the event in the form of berry, teas, jelly's, etc.

The first Jubilee occurred in 1983, directed by Mimi Monteith and Mary Hough to showcase the hospitality of the area.

== Education ==
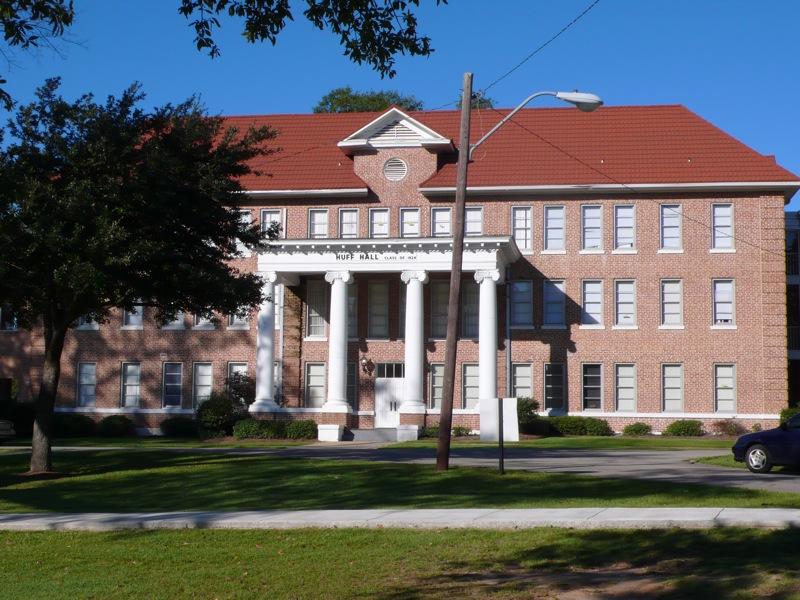
Huff Hall at Pearl River Community College

The City of Poplarville is served by the Poplarville School District and is home to Pearl River Community College.

== Notable people ==
- Theodore G. Bilbo, U.S. Senator, was born in 1877 in Juniper Grove, an eastern township of Poplarville.
- Jimmy Buffett, musician, lived in Poplarville for a period of time starting in 1959.
- Grady C. Cothen, preacher and president of the New Orleans Baptist Theological Seminary from 1970 to 1974
- Glen Day, PGA Tour Golfer.
- Jonathan J. C. Grey, federal judge of the United States District Court for the Eastern District of Michigan
- Chapel Hart, country music group.
- Jim Henderson, radio voice announcer for the New Orleans Saints from 2012 to 2018
- Hudson Holliday, politician and Major General in the Mississippi National Guard
- Zac Houston, Major League Baseball pitcher
- John Lumpkin, head football coach of the Mississippi State Teachers for the 1930 season
- Whitney Miller, the United States' first MasterChef.
- Jansen Owen, member of the Mississippi House of Representatives
- Mack Charles Parker, African-American victim of lynching in the United States.
- Argile Smith, pastor and president of Louisiana Christian University from 2014 to 2015
- Larkin I. Smith, member of U.S. House of Representatives.
- Martin T. Smith, lawyer and politician.
- Ahmos Zu-Bolton, activist, poet, playwright
