= WRJW =

- Picayune, Mississippi; United States
- Broadcast area: New Orleans, Louisiana
- Frequency: 1320 kHz

Programming
- Format: Country music
- Affiliations: ABC News Radio, Westwood One

Ownership
- Owner: Pearl River Communications, Inc.

History
- First air date: November 26, 1949

Technical information
- Licensing authority: FCC
- Facility ID: 52043
- Class: D
- Power: 5,000 watts day; 75 watts night
- Transmitter coordinates: 30°31′6″N 89°38′41″W
- Translator: 106.9 W295DG (Picayune)

Links
- Public license information: Public file; LMS
- Website: wrjw.com

WRJW (1320 AM) is a radio station broadcasting a country music format. Licensed to Picayune, Mississippi, United States, the station serves the New Orleans area. The station is owned by Pearl River Communications, Inc. and features programming from ABC News Radio and Westwood One.

This station was at one time the sister station to WKSY before being spun off in the 1990s.
