= Sidney Albritton =

American politician

Member of the Mississippi State Senate from the 40th district
- In office January 6, 2004 – January 3, 2012
- Preceded by: Joseph Stogner
- Succeeded by: Angela Burks Hill

Personal details
- Born: September 12, 1971 (age 54) Picayune, Mississippi
- Party: Republican

Sidney Albritton (born September 12, 1971) is an American politician who served in the Mississippi State Senate from the 40th district from 2004 to 2012.
