= Poplarville High School =

Public school in Poplarville, Mississippi

Location
- #1 Hornet Drive; Poplarville, Pearl River County, Mississippi 39470; United States; 30.8443°N 89.5350°W

Information
- Type: Public
- Established: 1909
- School district: Poplarville School District
- NCES District ID: 2803720
- Superintendent: Jonathan Will
- NCES School ID: 280372000708
- Principal: Jonathan Ray
- Grades: 9-12
- Enrollment: 540
- Student to teacher ratio: 12.43
- Colors: Green, Gold
- Mascot: Hornet
- Website: poplarvilleschools.org/poplarville-high-school/

Poplarville High School is a public school in Poplarville, Mississippi. Poplarville School District. In 2025 it had 137 graduating seniors.

== History ==
In 2003, the school district paid $900,000 to the family of a student who died after being hit in the head with a baseball during an informal batting practice that took place three years earlier. A year after the incident, the girl's softball coach collapsed and died of a heart attack during practice.

During the 2023–2024 school year, under Superintendent Jon Will and Principal Jonathan Ray, Poplarville High School was ranked the top high school in accountability scores in Mississippi. In 2024 a $17.7 million school bond for improvements to Poplarville's elementary and high school buildings was considered.

== Athletics ==
The football team won the 4A state title in 2024, defeating the Louisville Wildcats 29-28. It was the school's first state title in football. Poplarville High School is home to five start running back Ty Keys (Tylan Keys), who holds 29 offers, including Ole Miss, Mississippi State, LSU, and Miami. Keys is tied for the most touchdowns in a single game with 8, which he has held since 2025 after a breakout game against the Hancock Hawks; He racked up 506 yards in the game on 18 carries. He was MVP of the state 4A title game the prior year. In 2025 he was awarded the 4A Mr. Football title.

== Alumni ==
- Theodore Gilmore Bilbo, politician who served as governor of Mississippi and as a U.S. senator
- Leopold Locke, schools superintendent and member of the Mississippi House of Representatives
- Louise Smith, mayor of Poplarville
- Zac Houston, baseball pitcher
- Jonathan J. C. Grey, judge
- Pat Morris, coach
