= Picayune, Mississippi =

- City
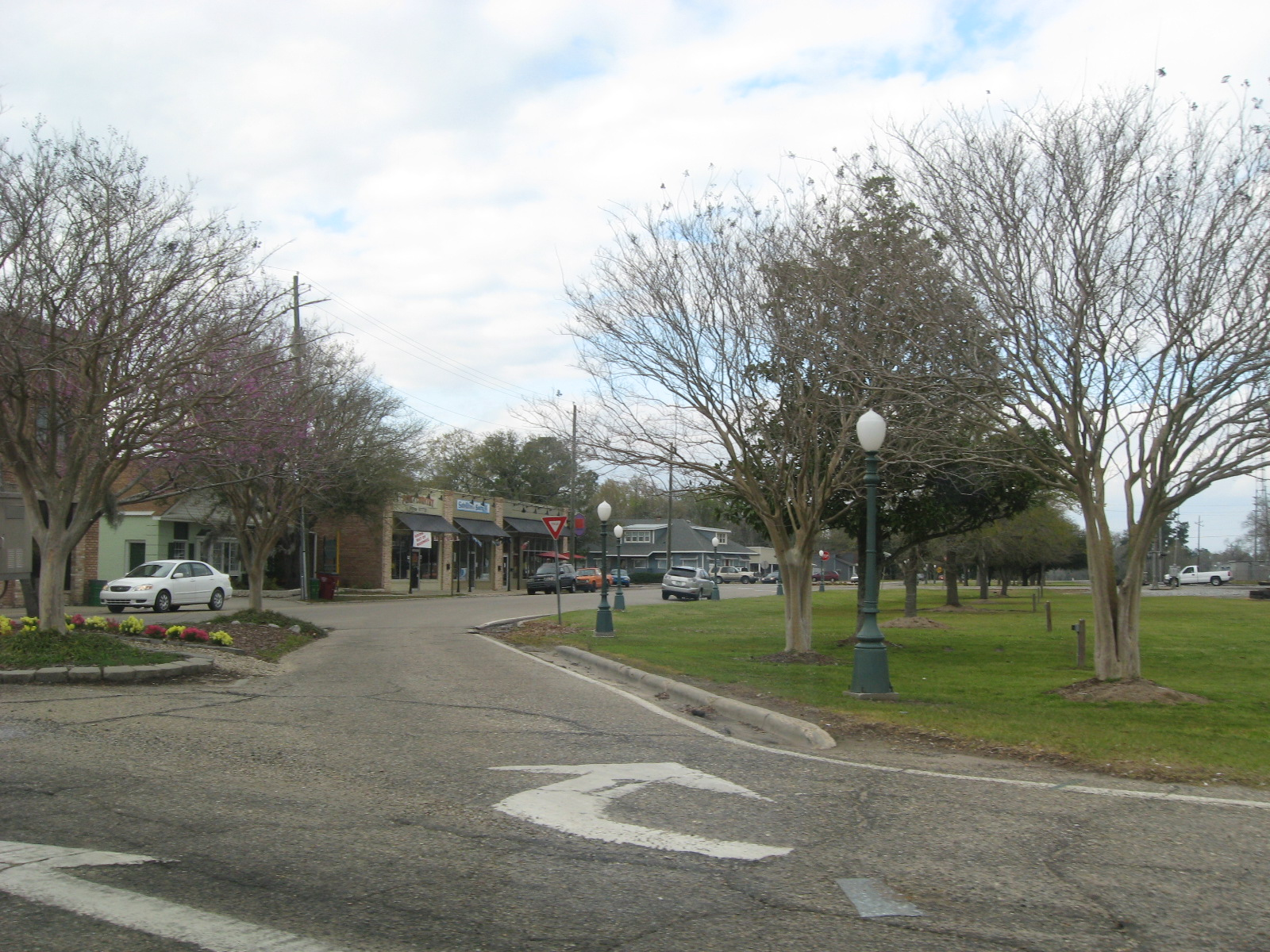
- Downtown Picayune

- Flag Seal

- Location of Picayune, Mississippi

- Location in the United States Picayune (the United States)
- Coordinates: 30°31′41″N 89°40′49″W
- Country: United States
- State: Mississippi
- County: Pearl River

Government
  - Mayor: Jim Luke (R)

Area
  - Total: 18.11 sq mi (46.91 km^{2})
  - Land: 18.04 sq mi (46.72 km^{2})
  - Water: 0.077 sq mi (0.20 km^{2})
- Elevation: 72 ft (22 m)

Population (2020)
  - Total: 11,885
  - Density: 659/sq mi (254.4/km^{2})
- Time zone: UTC−6 (Central (CST))
  - Summer (DST): UTC−5 (CDT)
- ZIP code: 39466
- Area code: 601
- FIPS code: 28-57160
- GNIS feature ID: 0675698
- Website: Picayune official website

Picayune (/ˌpɪkəˈjuːn/ PIK-ə-YOON) is the largest city in Pearl River County, Mississippi, United States. The population was 11,885 at the 2020 census. The city is located approximately 45 miles (72 km) from New Orleans, Hattiesburg, and Gulfport–Biloxi. The Stennis Space Center is 10 miles (16 km) away. Picayune is part of the New Orleans–Metairie–Hammond combined statistical area.

== History ==
The word "picayune" was the name of a Spanish coin, worth half a real or 1/16 of a Spanish dollar (6.25 cents). Its name derives from the French "picaillon", which is itself from the Provençal "picaioun", the name of an unrelated small copper coin from Savoy. By extension, picayune can mean "trivial" or "of little value".

Picayune was incorporated in 1904, and was named by Eliza Jane Poitevent Nicholson in late 1883 or early 1884. She was the owner and publisher of The Daily Picayune, a newspaper named for the coin.

The local post office contained a mural, subsequently covered over, Lumber Region of Mississippi, painted by Donald H. Robertson in 1940. Federally commissioned murals were produced from 1934 to 1943 in the United States through the Section of Painting and Sculpture, later called the Section of Fine Arts, of the Treasury Department.

=== Hurricane Katrina ===
While Picayune received extensive damage from Hurricane Katrina, it was not as severe as in other nearby cities. This caused Picayune to become the temporary home for many who relocated from the New Orleans area and from the Mississippi Gulf Coast who were seeking a safer home site with easy commuting to those areas.

The bulk of the Katrina damage in Picayune was caused by high winds, as the eye wall passed over the city. This resulted in widespread roof, window, and fence damage. The wind also caused hundreds, if not thousands, of downed trees and power outages of up to a few weeks.

== Geography ==
According to the United States Census Bureau, the city has a total area of 11.8 square miles (31 km^{2}), of which 11.8 square miles (31 km^{2}) is land and 0.04 square miles (0.10 km^{2}) (7.34%) is water. Picayune is a part of the New Orleans–Metairie–Hammond combined statistical area.

=== Climate ===
Climate data for Picayune, Mississippi (1991–2020)
Month	Jan	Feb	Mar	Apr	May	Jun	Jul	Aug	Sep	Oct	Nov	Dec	Year
Mean daily maximum °F (°C)	61.9 (16.6)	65.7 (18.7)	71.9 (22.2)	78.2 (25.7)	84.8 (29.3)	89.2 (31.8)	91.5 (33.1)	91.4 (33.0)	87.7 (30.9)	80.5 (26.9)	70.9 (21.6)	64.8 (18.2)	78.2 (25.7)
Daily mean °F (°C)	49.8 (9.9)	53.1 (11.7)	59.5 (15.3)	65.7 (18.7)	72.9 (22.7)	78.6 (25.9)	81.0 (27.2)	81.0 (27.2)	77.0 (25.0)	67.8 (19.9)	57.7 (14.3)	52.4 (11.3)	66.4 (19.1)
Mean daily minimum °F (°C)	37.8 (3.2)	40.6 (4.8)	47.0 (8.3)	53.3 (11.8)	60.9 (16.1)	68.0 (20.0)	70.5 (21.4)	70.6 (21.4)	66.2 (19.0)	55.2 (12.9)	44.6 (7.0)	40.0 (4.4)	54.6 (12.5)
Average precipitation inches (mm)	6.39 (162)	4.87 (124)	5.21 (132)	5.90 (150)	5.02 (128)	6.55 (166)	6.46 (164)	6.38 (162)	4.86 (123)	5.04 (128)	4.31 (109)	5.73 (146)	66.72 (1,694)
Average snowfall inches (cm)	0.0 (0.0)	0.0 (0.0)	0.0 (0.0)	0.0 (0.0)	0.0 (0.0)	0.0 (0.0)	0.0 (0.0)	0.0 (0.0)	0.0 (0.0)	0.0 (0.0)	0.0 (0.0)	0.0 (0.0)	0 (0)
Source: NOAA

== Demographics ==
Historical population
Census	Pop.	Note	%±
1910	846		—
1920	2,479		193.0%
1930	4,698		89.5%
1940	5,129		9.2%
1950	6,707		30.8%
1960	7,834		16.8%
1970	10,467		33.6%
1980	10,361		−1.0%
1990	10,633		2.6%
2000	10,535		−0.9%
2010	10,878		3.3%
2020	11,885		9.3%
U.S. Decennial Census

=== 2020 census ===
As of the 2020 census, there were 11,885 people residing in the city. There were 4,791 households and 2,951 families. The median age was 39.9 years. 24.0% of residents were under the age of 18 and 19.8% were 65 years of age or older. For every 100 females there were 85.6 males, and for every 100 females age 18 and over there were 81.4 males age 18 and over.

89.4% of residents lived in urban areas, while 10.6% lived in rural areas.

Of all households, 31.4% had children under the age of 18 living in them. 35.3% were married-couple households, 18.5% were households with a male householder and no spouse or partner present, and 38.6% were households with a female householder and no spouse or partner present. About 31.5% of all households were made up of individuals, and 14.9% had someone living alone who was 65 years of age or older.

There were 5,356 housing units, of which 10.5% were vacant. The homeowner vacancy rate was 2.8% and the rental vacancy rate was 9.3%.

Picayune racial composition
Race	Num.	Perc.
White (non-Hispanic)	6,709	56.45%
Black or African American (non-Hispanic)	3,975	33.45%
Native American	33	0.28%
Asian	103	0.87%
Other/Mixed	601	5.06%
Hispanic or Latino	464	3.9%

=== 2000 census ===
As of the census of 2000, there were 10,535 people, 4,100 households, and 2,865 families residing in the city. The population density was 895.6 inhabitants per square mile (345.8/km^{2}). There were 4,568 housing units at an average density of 388.3 per square mile (149.9/km^{2}). The racial makeup of the city was 62.02% White, 35.92% African American, 0.38% Native American, 0.30% Asian, 0.05% Pacific Islander, 0.18% from other races, and 1.15% from two or more races. Hispanic or Latino of any race were 1.15% of the population.

There were 4,100 households, out of which 31.8% had a children under the age of 18 living with them, 45.0% were married couples living together, 20.8% had a female householder with no husband present, and 30.1% were non-families. 26.4% of all households were made up of individuals, and 11.8% had someone living alone who was 65 years of age or older. The average household size was 2.54 and the average family size was 3.06.

In the city, the population was spread out, with 27.0% under the age of 18, 9.4% from 18 to 24, 25.5% from 25 to 44, 23.0% from 45 to 64, and 15.1% who were 65 years of age or older. The median age was 36 years. For every 100 females, there were 82.8 males. For every 100 females age 18 and over, there were 79.2 males.

The median income for a household in the city is $26,958, and the median income for a family was $33,260. Males had a median income of $31,438 versus $20,035 for females. The per capita income for the city was $15,798. About 18.9% of families and 20.8% of the population were below the poverty line, including 28.2% of those under age 18 and 17.6% of those age 65 or over.

== Education ==
- Almost all of the City of Picayune is located in the Picayune School District. A small section is in the Pearl River County School District.
- Within the Picayune school district: Picayune Junior High School serves as the middle school for grades 7 and 8. Picayune Memorial High School is the local high school. The school's mascot is the Maroon Tide. The Center of Alternate Education is also located in Picayune.
- Pearl River County school district operates Pearl River Central High School

All of Pearl River County is in the service area of Pearl River Community College.

Elementary schools (Picayune School District)

- Nicholson Elementary
- Roseland Park Elementary
- South Side Elementary
- West Side Elementary

== Media ==
=== Newspaper ===
Picayune's local newspaper is the Picayune Item.

=== Radio ===
The local radio station is WRJW 1320-AM.

Television and radio stations that are part of the New Orleans and Gulfport–Biloxi listening areas serve the city.

== Government ==
The United States Postal Service operates the Picayune Post Office. There is a mural made by the Works Progress Administration (WPA) but subsequent renovations covered up the mural with new paint.

== Infrastructure ==
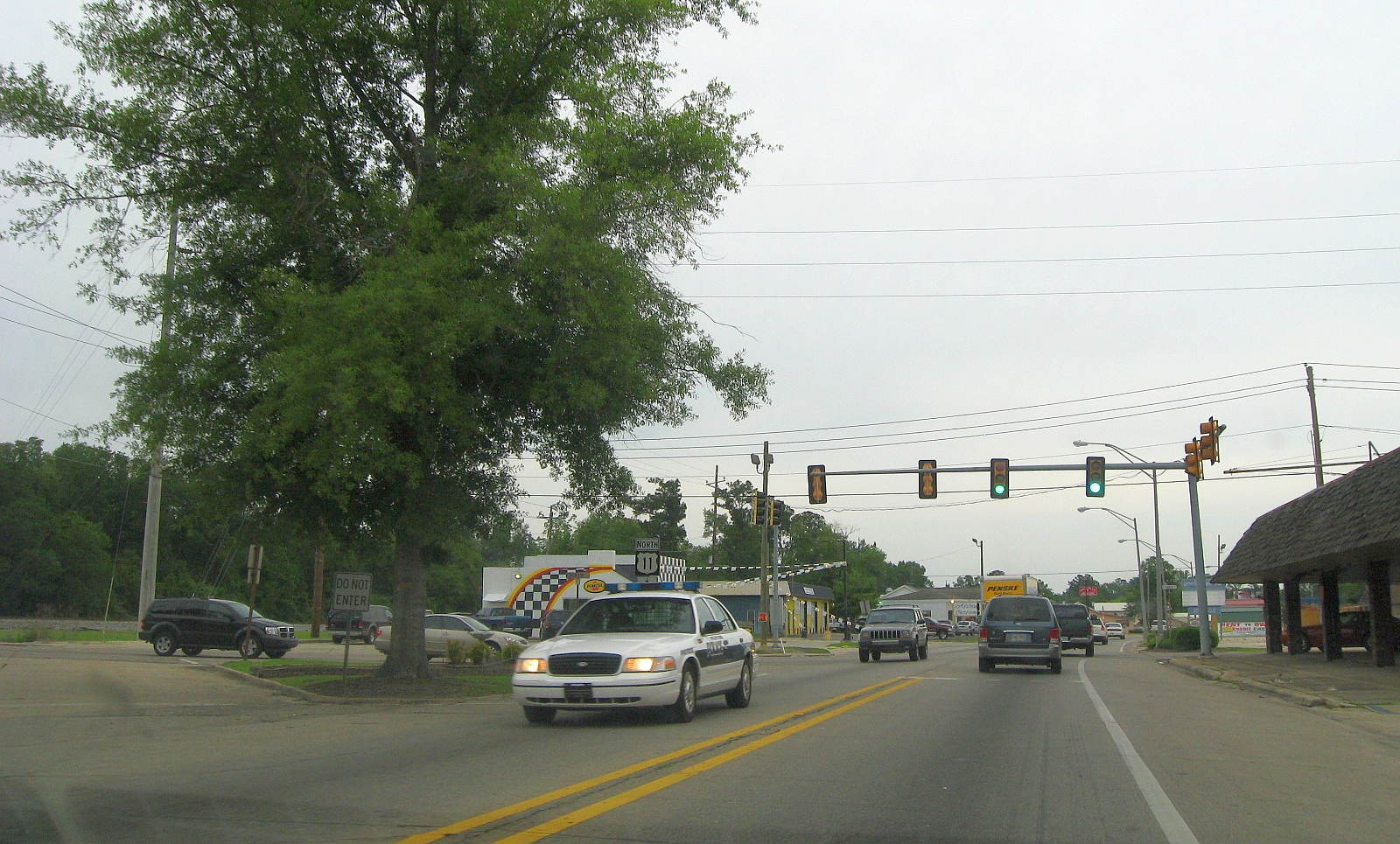
Highway 11 and Fourth Street

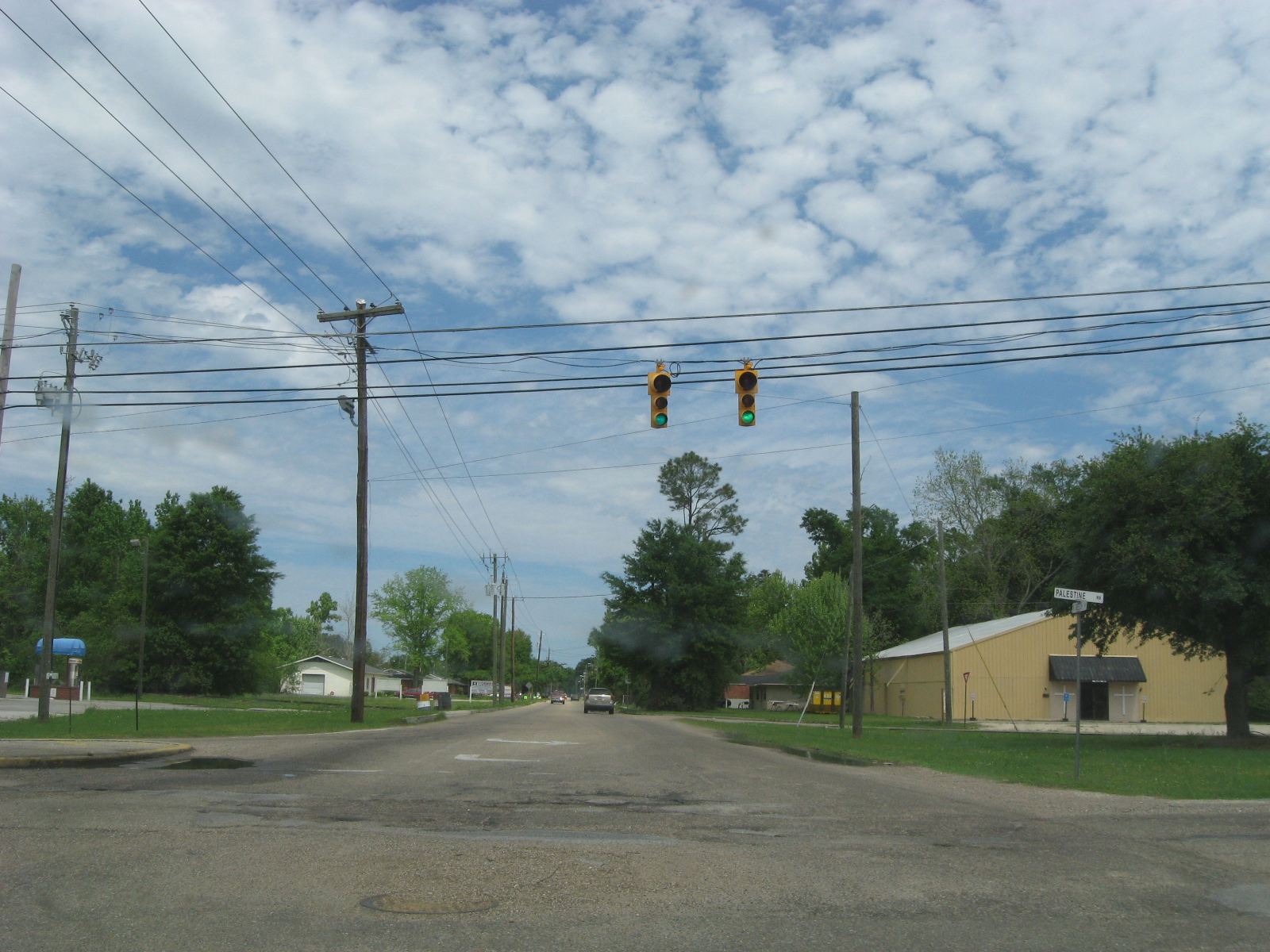
Palestine Road and Beech Street

=== Transportation ===
Amtrak's Crescent train connects Picayune with the cities of New York, Philadelphia, Baltimore, Washington, Charlotte, Atlanta, Birmingham, and New Orleans. The Amtrak station is situated at 100 South U.S. Route 11. There is daily service in each direction.

U.S. 11 is the main highway through Picayune. Interstate 59 (via Interstate 10) connects Picayune with New Orleans, LA, to the south and Hattiesburg, MS, Meridian, MS, and Birmingham, AL, to the north.

Mississippi Highway 43 is the main connection to and from the east, connecting to Interstate 10 near Kiln, MS.

Picayune Municipal Airport has a 5,000 ft (1,500 m) runway and is a popular destination for private fixed-wing and rotary aircraft visiting the New Orleans area. Rental car, taxi and limousine services are available.

==== Railroads ====
- Norfolk Southern Railway

==== Major highways ====
- U.S. Route 11
- Mississippi Highway 43
- Interstate 59

=== Library ===
The Margaret Reed Crosby Memorial Library serves Picayune and is the headquarters of the Pearl River County Library System.

== Notable people ==
- Sidney Albritton, member of the Mississippi Senate from 2004 to 2012
- Jonathan Bender, professional basketball player
- Bobby Bounds, former Arena Football League quarterback
- Nathaniel Burkett, serial killer
- Sol Carter, former Major League Baseball relief pitcher
- L.O. Crosby Sr., timber industrialist
- Jerone Davison, former NFL running back
- Charles DeJurnett, former NFL defensive tackle
- Dante Dowdell, college football running back
- Tommie Dukes, Negro league catcher
- Cailey Fleming, actress
- Brandon Fortenberry, basketball player for the Bulgarian National Basketball League
- Gary Goff, college football coach
- Angela Burks Hill, member of the Mississippi Senate
- Stacey Hobgood-Wilkes, member of the Mississippi House of Representatives
- Robbie Hood, atmospheric scientist
- T. J. House, professional baseball player
- Rhyne Hughes, professional baseball player
- Braxton Lee, former Major League Baseball outfielder
- Freddie Little, former professional boxer
- Michael Holloway Perronne, writer
- Matt Riser, college baseball coach
- Jesse Stockstill, former member of the Mississippi House of Representatives
- Tiffany Travis, former WNBA player

== Points of interest ==
- Crosby Arboretum
- Bogue Chitto National Wildlife Refuge
- Stennis Space Center
