= Picayune Memorial High School =

Location
- 800 Fifth Avenue; Picayune, Mississippi 39466; United States; 30°31′54″N 89°41′15″W

Information
- Type: Public
- Established: 1925
- School district: Picayune School District
- Principal: Kristi Mitchell
- Teaching staff: 56.49 (FTE)
- Grades: 9–12
- Enrollment: 960 (2023-2024)
- Student to teacher ratio: 16.99
- Colors: Maroon and White
- Mascot: Maroon Tide
- Website: phs.picayuneschools.org

Picayune Memorial High School is a grade 9–12 high school located in Picayune, Mississippi, United States. It is in the Picayune School District.

Communities in the school district (of which this is the sole comprehensive high school) are almost all of Picayune, the Nicholson census-designated place, and a small section of the Hide-A-Way Lake CDP.

== State championships ==
=== Football ===
- 1925
- 1943
- 1948
- 1986
- 2011
- 2013
- 2021
- 2022

=== Baseball ===
- 2002

=== Golf ===
- 1992
- 2021

== Notable people ==
=== Staff ===
- Butch van Breda Kolff, former college and NBA coach was head basketball coach from 1983 to 1984.
- Jimmy Johnson, former college and NFL head football coach was an assistant coach in 1966.

=== Alumni ===
- Jonathan Bender (1999), basketball player of the Indiana Pacers and New York Knicks
- Jerone Davison, football player of the Oakland Raiders
- Dante Dowdell (2023), college football running back for the Oregon Ducks, the Nebraska Cornhuskers, and the Kentucky Wildcats
- TJ House (2008), baseball player of the Cleveland Indians and Toronto Blue Jays
- Rhyne Hughes, baseball player of the Baltimore Orioles
