= Lumberton, Mississippi =

- City
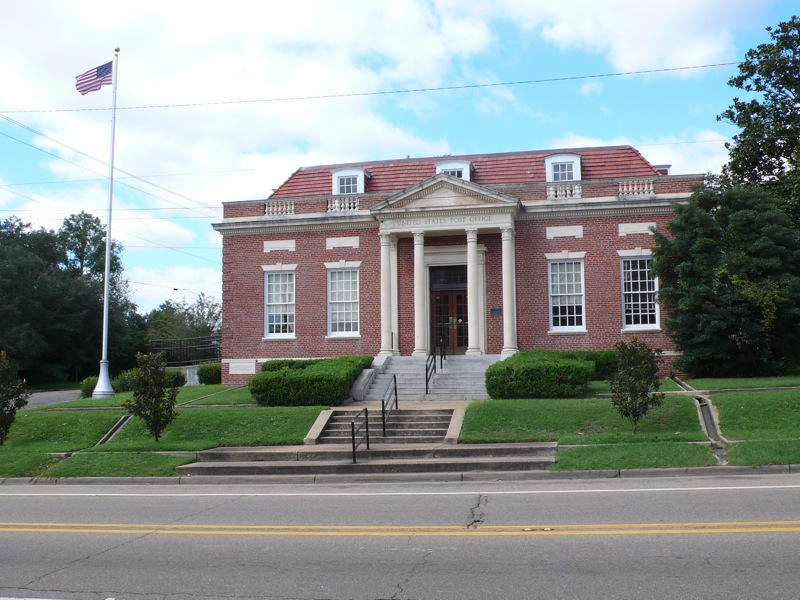
- The U.S. Post Office in Lumberton, Mississippi

- Location of Lumberton, Mississippi

- Location in the United States
- Coordinates: 31°0′14″N 89°27′13″W
- Country: United States
- State: Mississippi
- Counties: Lamar, Pearl River

Government
  - Mayor: James Sandifer Jr. (D)

Area
  - Total: 7.13 sq mi (18.47 km^{2})
  - Land: 7.11 sq mi (18.41 km^{2})
  - Water: 0.023 sq mi (0.06 km^{2})
- Elevation: 300 ft (90 m)

Population (2020)
  - Total: 1,617
  - Density: 227.5/sq mi (87.83/km^{2})
- Time zone: UTC-6 (Central (CST))
  - Summer (DST): UTC-5 (CDT)
- ZIP code: 39455
- Area code: 601
- FIPS code: 28-42640
- GNIS feature ID: 0693845

Lumberton is a city in Lamar and Pearl River counties, Mississippi, United States. It is part of the Hattiesburg, Mississippi Metropolitan Statistical Area. As of the 2020 census, Lumberton had a population of 1,617.

== History ==
The city was named for the local lumber industry.

== Geography ==
Most of the city is in Lamar County, with a small portion extending east into adjacent Pearl River County. In the 2000 census, 2,200 of the city's 2,228 residents (98.7%) lived in Lamar County and 28 (1.3%) in Pearl River County.

According to the United States Census Bureau, the city has a total area of 7.3 square miles (18.9 km^{2}), of which 7.3 square miles (18.8 km^{2}) is land and 0.04 square mile (0.1 km^{2}) (0.27%) is water.

== Demographics ==
Historical population
Census	Pop.	Note	%±
1900	1,509		—
1910	2,122		40.6%
1920	2,192		3.3%
1930	2,374		8.3%
1940	1,485		−37.4%
1950	1,803		21.4%
1960	2,108		16.9%
1970	2,084		−1.1%
1980	2,217		6.4%
1990	2,121		−4.3%
2000	2,228		5.0%
2010	2,086		−6.4%
2020	1,617		−22.5%
U.S. Decennial Census

=== Racial and ethnic composition ===
Lumberton city, Mississippi – Racial and ethnic composition Note: the US Census treats Hispanic/Latino as an ethnic category. This table excludes Latinos from the racial categories and assigns them to a separate category. Hispanics/Latinos may be of any race.
Race / Ethnicity (NH = Non-Hispanic)	Pop 2000	Pop 2010	Pop 2020	% 2000	% 2010	% 2020
White alone (NH)	1,008	879	594	45.24%	42.14%	36.73%
Black or African American alone (NH)	1,193	1,172	894	53.55%	56.18%	55.29%
Native American or Alaska Native alone (NH)	6	3	3	0.27%	0.14%	0.19%
Asian alone (NH)	2	0	5	0.09%	0.00%	0.31%
Native Hawaiian or Pacific Islander alone (NH)	0	0	0	0.00%	0.00%	0.00%
Other race alone (NH)	0	2	7	0.00%	0.10%	0.43%
Mixed race or Multiracial (NH)	9	19	89	0.40%	0.91%	5.50%
Hispanic or Latino (any race)	10	11	25	0.45%	0.53%	1.55%
Total	2,228	2,086	1,617	100.00%	100.00%	100.00%

=== 2020 census ===
As of the 2020 census, Lumberton had a population of 1,617. The median age was 40.3 years. 24.4% of residents were under the age of 18 and 18.7% of residents were 65 years of age or older. For every 100 females there were 88.9 males, and for every 100 females age 18 and over there were 83.2 males age 18 and over.

0.0% of residents lived in urban areas, while 100.0% lived in rural areas.

There were 673 households in Lumberton, of which 29.9% had children under the age of 18 living in them. Of all households, 27.8% were married-couple households, 23.3% were households with a male householder and no spouse or partner present, and 44.3% were households with a female householder and no spouse or partner present. About 33.6% of all households were made up of individuals and 13.9% had someone living alone who was 65 years of age or older. There were 435 families residing in the city.

There were 865 housing units, of which 22.2% were vacant. The homeowner vacancy rate was 3.4% and the rental vacancy rate was 21.7%.

== Government ==
In 2025, Democrat James H. Sandifer defeated incumbent mayor Quincy Rogers with over 80% of the vote.

== Education ==
The City of Lumberton is served by the Lamar County School District. The Lumberton Public School District consolidated into it as of 2019.

Lumberton includes Lumberton Elementary School, Lumberton Middle School and Lumberton High School.

== Notable people ==
- Percy Bailey, former Negro league baseball pitcher
- Elizabeth Bass, physician, educator, and suffragist
- Richie Grant, safety for the Atlanta Falcons
- Terry Grant, former running back for the Hamilton Tiger-Cats
- Heber Austin Ladner, former longest serving Secretary of State of Mississippi
- John Henry Prince, former Negro league third baseman
- James H. Street, journalist, minister, and writer of Southern historical novels.
- Richard Alvin Tonry, Louisiana politician.
- Henry Clay Yawn, former member of the Mississippi Senate
