= Pearl River County, Mississippi =

County in Mississippi, United States

- County
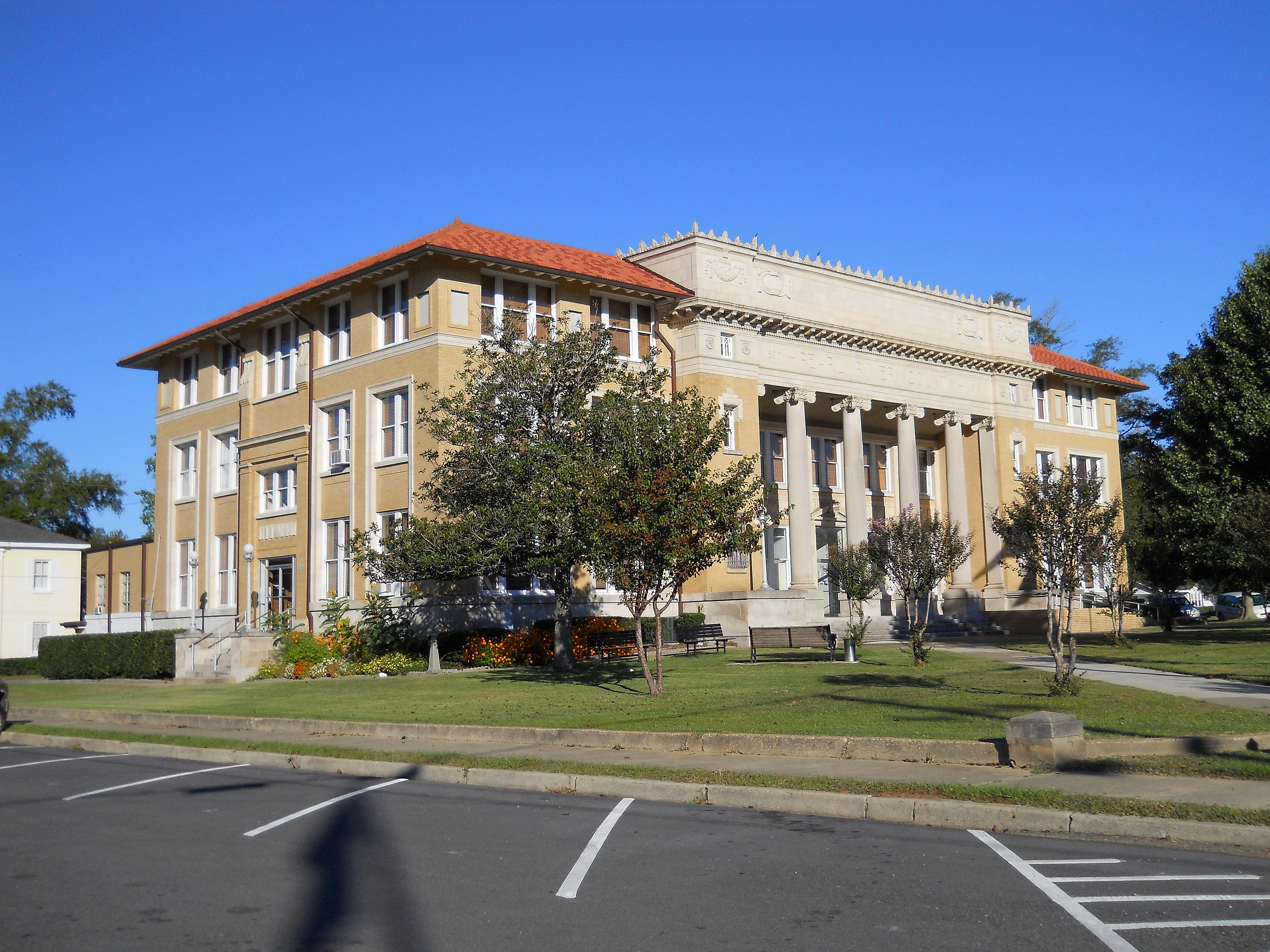
- Pearl River County Courthouse in Poplarville

- Seal

- Location within the U.S. state of Mississippi
- Coordinates: 30°46′N 89°35′W
- Country: United States
- State: Mississippi
- Founded: 1890
- Named for: Pearl River
- Seat: Poplarville
- Largest city: Picayune

Area
  - Total: 819 sq mi (2,120 km^{2})
  - Land: 811 sq mi (2,100 km^{2})
  - Water: 8.0 sq mi (21 km^{2}) 1.0%

Population (2020)
  - Total: 56,145
  - Estimate (2025): 59,363 ▲
  - Density: 69.2/sq mi (26.7/km^{2})
- Time zone: UTC−6 (Central)
  - Summer (DST): UTC−5 (CDT)
- Congressional district: 4th
- Website: www.pearlrivercounty.net

Pearl River County is a county located in the U.S. state of Mississippi. The population was 56,145 at the 2020 census. Its county seat is Poplarville. Pearl River County comprises the Picayune, MS Micropolitan Statistical Area, which is included in the New Orleans-Metairie-Hammond, LA-MS Combined Statistical Area. Pearl River County is a dry county, and as such, the sale, transportation, and even private possession of beverage alcohol is prohibited by law, except within Picayune and Poplarville.

== History ==
Pearl River County was originally formed as Pearl County in 1872 from portions of Hancock and Marion Counties. Because of low population density and a small tax base, Pearl County dissolved in 1878. Present-day Pearl River County was organized in 1890 by an act of the Mississippi Legislature utilizing the same land area as its predecessor Pearl County.

On the night of April 24, 1959, Mack Charles Parker, an African-American accused of rape, was abducted from the Pearl River County jail in Poplarville by a mob and shot to death. His body was found in the Pearl River 10 days later. The FBI investigated and even obtained confessions from some of the eight suspects. However, the county prosecutor refused to present evidence to a state grand jury and a federal grand jury refused to indict. The case focused national attention on the persistence of lynching in the South and helped accelerate the American Civil Rights Movement.

On August 29, 2005, Hurricane Katrina inflicted heavy damage on the small town of Poplarville. The storm's most powerful, unofficially recorded gust of wind was reported at Pearl River Community College, at 135 mph (217 km/h). On September 2, 2005, the 1st Battalion, 134th Field Artillery (Ohio Army National Guard) arrived at the National Guard armory in Poplarville to assist the community and Pearl River County in recovery efforts in the wake of Hurricane Katrina. Initial efforts were the security of banks, pharmacies and gas stations as well as initial responses to rural emergencies. The unit stayed for three weeks ultimately checking on every family and structure in the county. On September 5, 2005, Poplarville played host to a visit by George W. Bush, Laura Bush, and Governor Haley Barbour to Pearl River Community College in the aftermath of Hurricane Katrina.

== Geography ==
According to the U.S. Census Bureau, the county has a total area of 819 square miles (2,120 km^{2}), of which 811 square miles (2,100 km^{2}) is land and 8.0 square miles (21 km^{2}) (1.0%) is water. It is the fourth-largest county in Mississippi by land area.

=== Major highways ===
- Interstate 59
- U.S. Highway 11
- Mississippi Highway 13
- Mississippi Highway 26
- Mississippi Highway 43
- Mississippi Highway 53
- Mississippi Highway 607

=== Adjacent counties and parishes ===
- Lamar County (north)
- Forrest County (northeast)
- Stone County (east)
- Hancock County (south)
- St. Tammany Parish, Louisiana (southwest)
- Washington Parish, Louisiana (west)
- Marion County (northwest)

=== National protected areas ===
- Bogue Chitto National Wildlife Refuge (part)
- De Soto National Forest (part)

== Media ==
=== Newspaper ===
Picayune's local newspaper is the Picayune Item.

=== Radio ===
The local radio station is WRJW 1320-AM.

Television and Radio stations of New Orleans and Biloxi/Gulfport listening areas are part of Picayune area.

== Demographics ==
Historical population
Census	Pop.	Note	%±
1890	2,957		—
1900	6,697		126.5%
1910	10,593		58.2%
1920	15,648		47.7%
1930	19,405		24.0%
1940	19,125		−1.4%
1950	20,641		7.9%
1960	22,411		8.6%
1970	27,802		24.1%
1980	33,795		21.6%
1990	38,714		14.6%
2000	48,621		25.6%
2010	55,834		14.8%
2020	56,145		0.6%
2025 (est.)	59,363	▲	5.7%
U.S. Decennial Census; 1790-1960 1900-1990; 1990-2000 2010-2013 2018

=== Racial and ethnic composition ===
Pearl River County, Mississippi – Racial and ethnic composition Note: the US Census treats Hispanic/Latino as an ethnic category. This table excludes Latinos from the racial categories and assigns them to a separate category. Hispanics/Latinos may be of any race.
Race / Ethnicity (NH = Non-Hispanic)	Pop 1980	Pop 1990	Pop 2000	Pop 2010	Pop 2020	% 1980	% 1990	% 2000	% 2010	% 2020
White alone (NH)	28,391	32,670	41,181	45,911	44,101	84.01%	84.39%	84.70%	82.23%	78.55%
Black or African American alone (NH)	5,011	5,522	5,888	6,853	6,666	14.83%	14.26%	12.11%	12.27%	11.87%
Native American or Alaska Native alone (NH)	53	141	212	281	256	0.16%	0.36%	0.44%	0.50%	0.46%
Asian alone (NH)	42	79	130	222	275	0.12%	0.20%	0.27%	0.40%	0.49%
Native Hawaiian or Pacific Islander alone (NH)	x	x	12	31	0	x	x	0.02%	0.06%	0.00%
Other race alone (NH)	15	2	39	48	165	0.04%	0.01%	0.08%	0.09%	0.29%
Mixed race or Multiracial (NH)	x	x	473	852	2,398	x	x	0.97%	1.53%	4.27%
Hispanic or Latino (any race)	283	300	686	1,636	2,284	0.84%	0.77%	1.41%	2.93%	4.07%
Total	33,795	38,714	48,621	55,834	56,145	100.00%	100.00%	100.00%	100.00%	100.00%

=== 2020 census ===
As of the 2020 census, the county had a population of 56,145. The median age was 41.6 years. 22.8% of residents were under the age of 18 and 19.8% of residents were 65 years of age or older. For every 100 females there were 96.0 males, and for every 100 females age 18 and over there were 93.6 males age 18 and over.

The racial makeup of the county was 79.9% White, 12.0% Black or African American, 0.5% American Indian and Alaska Native, 0.5% Asian, <0.1% Native Hawaiian and Pacific Islander, 1.2% from some other race, and 5.9% from two or more races. Hispanic or Latino residents of any race comprised 4.1% of the population.

29.0% of residents lived in urban areas, while 71.0% lived in rural areas.

There were 21,703 households in the county, of which 31.1% had children under the age of 18 living in them. Of all households, 48.3% were married-couple households, 18.8% were households with a male householder and no spouse or partner present, and 26.6% were households with a female householder and no spouse or partner present. About 26.7% of all households were made up of individuals and 12.7% had someone living alone who was 65 years of age or older.

There were 24,641 housing units, of which 11.9% were vacant. Among occupied housing units, 75.8% were owner-occupied and 24.2% were renter-occupied. The homeowner vacancy rate was 1.8% and the rental vacancy rate was 8.9%.

=== 2010 census ===
As of the 2010 census Pearl River County had a population of 55,834. The ethnic and racial make-up of the population was 82.2% non-Hispanic white, 12.3% African-American, 0.6% Native American, 0.4% Asian, 0.1% Pacific Islander, 0.1% non-Hispanic from some other race, 1.7% from two or more races (0.5% reporting being white and black) and 2.9% Hispanic or Latino.

=== 2000 census ===
As of the census of 2000, there were 48,621 people, 18,078 households, and 13,576 families residing in the county. The population density was 60 people per square mile (23 people/km^{2}). There were 20,610 housing units at an average density of 25 per square mile (9.7/km^{2}). The racial makeup of the county was 85.55% White, 12.18% Black or African American, 0.50% Native American, 0.27% Asian, 0.03% Pacific Islander, 0.34% from other races, and 1.13% from two or more races. 1.41% of the population were Hispanic or Latino of any race.

There were 18,078 households, out of which 34.80% had children under the age of 18 living with them, 58.30% were married couples living together, 12.50% had a female householder with no husband present, and 24.90% were non-families. 21.70% of all households were made up of individuals, and 9.00% had someone living alone who was 65 years of age or older. The average household size was 2.65 and the average family size was 3.08.

In the county, the population was spread out, with 27.00% under the age of 18, 9.40% from 18 to 24, 27.10% from 25 to 44, 23.90% from 45 to 64, and 12.60% who were 65 years of age or older. The median age was 36 years. For every 100 females there were 94.40 males. For every 100 females age 18 and over, there were 91.00 males.

The median income for a household in the county was $30,912, and the median income for a family was $35,924. Males had a median income of $30,370 versus $21,519 for females. The per capita income for the county was $15,160. About 15.50% of families and 18.40% of the population were below the poverty line, including 25.60% of those under age 18 and 12.50% of those age 65 or over.

== Government ==
Supervisors

- District 1: Donald Hart
- District 2: Malcolm Perry
- District 3: Cruz Russell
- District 4: Jason Spence
- District 5: Bryce Lott

Countywide Elected Officials

- Sheriff - David Allison
- Circuit Clerk - Nance Fitzpatrick Stokes
- Chancery Clerk - Melinda Smith Bowman
- Tax Assessor/Collector - Gary Beech
- County Prosecutor - Michael E. Patten
- Coroner - Derek Turnage
- County Court Judge - Richelle Lumpkin

State Legislature

- Senator Angela Burks-Hill - District 40
- Senator Joseph "Mike" Seymour - District 47
- Rep. Jansen Owen - District 106
- Rep. Stacey Hobgood-Wilkes - District 108
- Rep. Timmy Ladner - District 93

United States presidential election results for Pearl River County, Mississippi
Year	Republican		Democratic		Third party(ies)	
Year	No.	%	No.	%	No.	%
1912	7	2.24%	290	92.95%	15	4.81%
1916	35	6.28%	521	93.54%	1	0.18%
1920	53	10.21%	464	89.40%	2	0.39%
1924	164	14.67%	855	76.48%	99	8.86%
1928	918	51.09%	879	48.91%	0	0.00%
1932	99	6.14%	1,500	92.99%	14	0.87%
1936	81	6.53%	1,156	93.23%	3	0.24%
1940	88	4.15%	2,022	95.47%	8	0.38%
1944	84	3.79%	2,131	96.21%	0	0.00%
1948	46	2.17%	146	6.88%	1,929	90.95%
1952	1,741	45.80%	2,060	54.20%	0	0.00%
1956	1,129	39.64%	1,274	44.73%	445	15.63%
1960	651	18.69%	1,276	36.64%	1,556	44.67%
1964	4,009	84.51%	735	15.49%	0	0.00%
1968	1,298	15.69%	926	11.19%	6,050	73.12%
1972	7,487	88.04%	901	10.60%	116	1.36%
1976	4,332	44.82%	5,024	51.98%	309	3.20%
1980	6,822	56.19%	5,028	41.41%	291	2.40%
1984	9,978	76.10%	3,085	23.53%	49	0.37%
1988	10,220	71.30%	3,939	27.48%	174	1.21%
1992	7,726	52.21%	4,683	31.65%	2,388	16.14%
1996	8,212	57.12%	4,892	34.03%	1,273	8.85%
2000	11,575	70.25%	4,611	27.98%	291	1.77%
2004	14,896	76.44%	4,472	22.95%	119	0.61%
2008	17,881	79.67%	4,320	19.25%	242	1.08%
2012	17,549	78.96%	4,366	19.65%	309	1.39%
2016	17,782	81.26%	3,604	16.47%	497	2.27%
2020	19,595	81.53%	4,148	17.26%	290	1.21%
2024	20,438	82.84%	3,982	16.14%	251	1.02%

== Communities ==
=== Cities ===
- Lumberton (mostly in Lamar County)
- Picayune
- Poplarville (county seat)

=== Census-designated places ===
- Hide-A-Way Lake
- Nicholson

=== Other unincorporated communities ===
- Caesar
- Carriere
- McNeill

== Education ==
School districts include:

- Lamar County School District
- Pearl River County School District
- Picayune School District
- Poplarville Separate School District

Former school districts:

- Lumberton Public School District - Merged into the Lamar County district in 2018.

The county is in the service area of Pearl River Community College.

== See also ==
- National Register of Historic Places listings in Pearl River County, Mississippi
