= Type C7 ship =

Designation for American container ships

The Type C7 ship (Lancer Class) is a United States Maritime Administration (MARAD) designation for a cargo ship and the first US purpose-built container ship. The vessels were constructed in US shipyards and entered service starting in 1968. As US-built ships they were Jones Act qualified for shipments between US domestic ports. Under the Jones Act, domestic US maritime trade is restricted to US-built and flagged vessels of US owners and crewed by predominantly US-citizens. The last active Lancer container-configured ship was scrapped in 2019. Lancers of the vehicle Roll-on/Roll-off (RO/RO) configuration remain held in the Ready Reserve Force, National Defense Reserve Fleet and the US Navy Military Sealift Command. All are steam powered.

== United States Lines C7-S-68 Series ==
Eight Type C7-S-68 ships were built by Sun Shipbuilding for the United States Lines and entered service from 1968 to 1971. Upon the bankruptcy and dissolution of the company the ships were sold to other carriers. The design proved very reliable as all of the Lancer Class vessels operated until at least 2002. In October 2014 the last active '68 series Lancer Horizon Discovery, was delivered to the Bay Bridge Scrapyard in Brownsville, Texas. "..the Lancers revolutionized shipping as being the first true large (at that time) container ships. [They were] built for U.S. Lines and ran on the East Coast to Far East run for many years...Discovery also served in Desert Storm. Her keel was laid exactly 47 years ago on 10/26/1967..It has been an honor taking this grand ole girl to her final resting place. She sure had a good run for many years. Instead of going down kicking and screaming she ran proud and well right to the very end and went down easy." - Captain Bill Boyce

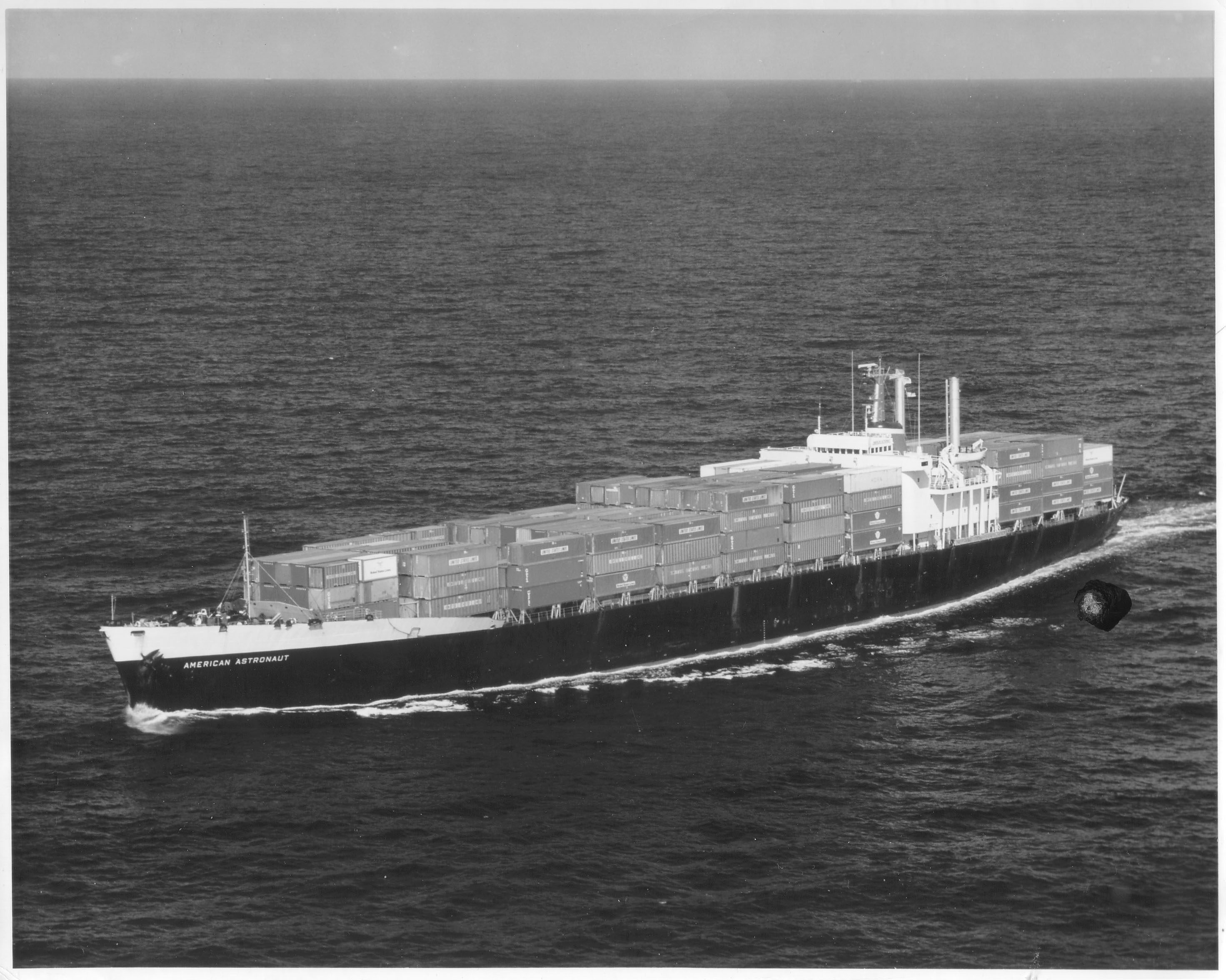
Lancer Class container ship SS American Astronaut of the United States Lines, at sea in 1969.

MA Hull #	MA Design	Original Name	Shipyard Hull #	GT	DWT	Delivery	IMO	Later Names	Fate
184	C7-S-68c	American Lancer	640	18,764	22,225	1968	IMO 6708379	Humacao	Scrapped 2002
185	C7-S-68c	American Legion	641	18,764	22,138	1968	IMO 6812211	Sea-Land Challenger, Horizon Challenger	Scrapped 2014
186	C7-S-68d	American Liberty	642	18,876	21,665	1968	IMO 6820579	Sea-Land Discovery, Horizon Discovery	Scrapped 2014
187	C7-S-68d	American Lynx	643	18,876	21,665	1968	IMO 6828624	Mayaguez	Scrapped 2004
188	C7-S-68d	American Lark	644	18,876	20,574	1969	IMO 6905252	Horizon Crusader	Scrapped 2010
240	C7-S-68e	American Astronaut	649	18,876	20,574	1969	IMO 6916861	Guayuma	Scrapped 2002
251	C7-S-68e	American Apollo	654	18,876	20,574	1970	IMO 7026259	Nuevo San Juan	Scrapped 2002
252	C7-S-68e	American Aquarius	655	18,876	20,480	1971	IMO 7042485	Carolina	Scrapped 2002

== Pacific Far East Line C7-S-88 Series ==
Bethlehem Steel's Sparrows Point Shipyard constructed two C7-S-88a container ships for San Francisco, California–based Pacific Far East Line (PFEL). These two ships were actually designed for and ordered by Matson Navigation, but when Matson decided to discontinue its transpacific operations the two ships were taken over by PFEL while still under construction. PFEL's ship names ended with Bear, and the two new ships were launched as SS Australia Bear and SS New Zealand Bear. Australia Bear was completed in 1973, but before New Zealand Bear had been fully outfitted both ships were sold in 1974 to Sea-Land Service, Inc. and renamed Sea-Land Consumer and Sea-Land Producer as Sealand's SL18P class. Sea-Land was bought by the CSX Corporation in 1986, and both ships were renamed in 2000. The domestic U.S. liner operations of Sea-Land were sold in 2003 and subsequently operated under the name Horizon Lines. Their service life came in a full circle when Matson, who had initially designed the ships decades earlier, acquired Horizon Lines in 2015. The vessels would serve their new owners a few more years as Matson Consumer and Matson Producer. They were scrapped in 2018 and 2019 respectively.

MA Hull #	MA Design	Original Name	Shipyard Hull #	GT	DWT	Delivery	IMO	Later Names	Fate
253	C7-S-88a	Australia Bear	4639	23,763	26,600	1973	IMO 7224306	Sea-Land Consumer, CSX Consumer, Horizon Consumer, Matson Consumer	Scrapped 2018
254	C7-S-88a	New Zealand Bear	4640	23,763	26,600	1974	IMO 7366312	Sea-Land Producer, CSX Producer, Horizon Producer, Matson Producer	Scrapped 2019

== States Steamship Lines C7-S-95 Series ==
The States Steamship Lines (or States Lines) ordered four C7-S-95a ships from Bath Iron Works to carry both mixed and containerized cargo. These vessels differed from the earlier C7s in that they have an aft cargo ramp. Their service speed is 23 knots and the States Lines operated the vessels between the US west coast and Asian ports. Their service time with the States Line however was brief as high fuel prices and competition drove the company into bankruptcy in 1979. The vessels were eventually acquired by the US Government and are among the 27 RO/RO ships in the Military Sealift Command. All are steam powered and maintained in the Ready Reserve Force with 5 days as time to activate.

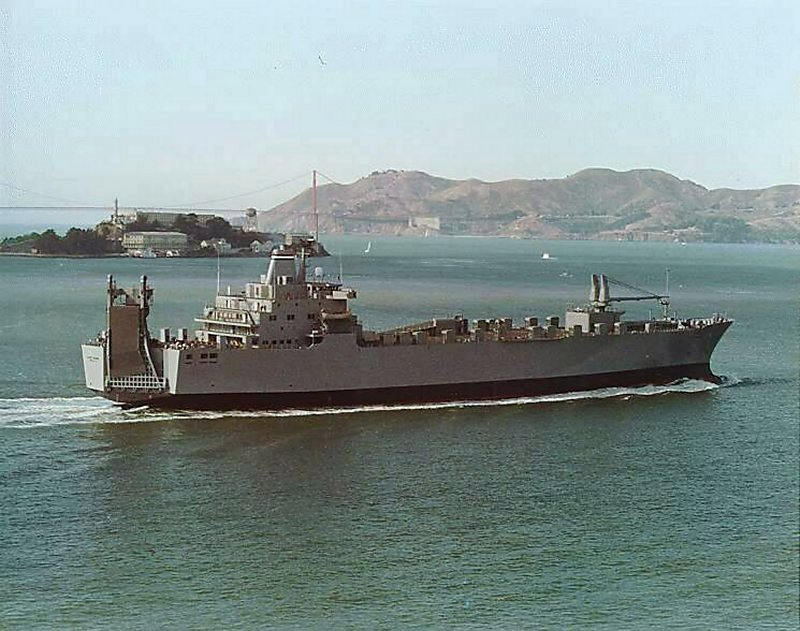
Military Sealift Command SS Cape Island

MA Hull #	MA Design	Original Name	Shipyard Hull #	GT	DWT	Delivery	IMO	Later Names	Status
279	C7-S-95a	Maine	366	15,000	14,500	27 April 1976	7390105	Tyson Lykes, Cape Inscription	RRF at Long Beach, CA 2020
280	C7-S-95a	Arizona	367	15,000	14,500	8 June 1976	7390117	Lipscomb Lykes, USNS Jupiter, Cape Intrepid	RRF at Tacoma, WA 2020
281	C7-S-95a	Nevada	368	15,000	14,500	30 Nov 1976	7390129	Charles Lykes, Cape Isabel	RRF at Long Beach, CA 2020
295	C7-S-95a	Illinois	369	15,000	14,500	3 June 1977	7390131	USNS Mercury, Cape Island	RRF at Tacoma, WA 2020

== Waterman Line C7-S-133a Series ==
Three C7 ships in the RO/RO configuration, designated as MARAD design C7-S-1331a, were built for the Waterman Line. The John B. Waterman and Thomas Heyward were completed by Sun Shipbuilding. The Charles Carroll was subcontracted to the General Dynamics Quincy Shipbuilding Division. These would be the last ships constructed by the respective shipyards before their closure. In 1984-1985 all three were converted to pre-positioning supply ships for the US Navy Military Sealift Command (MSC) by the National Steel and Shipbuilding Company, San Diego, CA. The ships gained 157 feet amidships, a helicopter landing platform, and cranes to enable them to unload their own cargo. They retained their steam boilers but were retrofitted with two GE turbines. As of July 2020 all three were in the inventory of the MSC. All three ships were commissioned into the MSC as Sgt. Matej Kocak-class dry cargo ships.

MA Hull #	MA Design	Original Name	Shipyard Hull #	GT^{[as built]}	DWT	Delivery	IMO	Later Names	Status
346	C7-S-1331a	John B. Waterman	679	18,500	23,500	23 March 1983	7802706	USNS Sgt. Matej Kocak (T-AK-3005)	Active 2020
347	C7-S-1331a	Thomas Heyward	680	18,500	23,500	11 February 1983	7823463	USNS PFC Eugene A. Obregon (T-AK-3006)	Active 2020
511	C7-S-1331a	Charles Carroll	86	18,500	23,500	18 April 1983	7912123	USNS Maj. Stephen W. Pless (T-AK-3007)	Active 2020
