= SS Cape Intrepid =

American cargo ship of the U.S. Maritime Administration

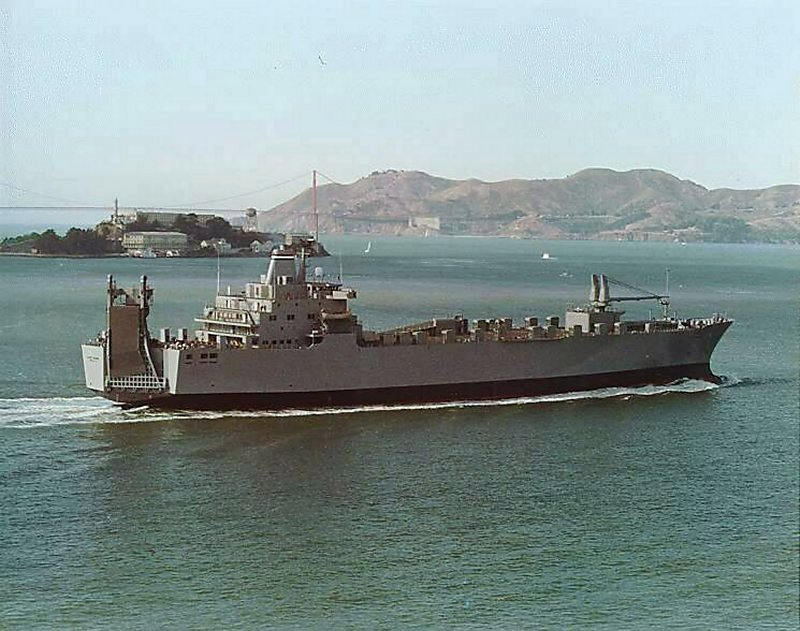
- SS Cape Island, Cape Intrepid's sister ship, sailing into harbor

History

United States
- Name: SS Arizona
- Owner: United States Maritime Administration
- Builder: Bath Iron Works, Bath, ME.
- Laid down: 27 January 1975
- Launched: 1 November 1976
- Acquired: 8 June 1976, to States Lines, and renamed the USNS Jupiter
- Renamed: SS Cape Island, 22 November 1993 and assigned to the Maritime Administration's Ready Reserve Force
- Identification: IMO number: 7390117; MMSI number: 366221000; Callsign: WLDL
- Honors and awards: National Defense Service Medal
- Status: laid up as part of the National Defense Reserve Fleet in a layberth at Tacoma, WA. in ROS-5 status

General characteristics
- Class & type: Roll-on/Roll-off Ship
- Displacement: 15,000 tons, 33,900 tons full
- Length: 685 ft (209 m)
- Beam: 102 ft (31 m)
- Draft: 32 ft (9.8 m)
- Propulsion: two steam turbines, two propellers
- Speed: 18.7 Knots
- Range: Not Disclosed
- Complement: Full Operational Status 31, Reduced Operational Status 9
- Time to activate: 5 days
- Armament: None

SS Cape Intrepid was originally laid down in 1975 as SS Arizona a Type C7 ship intended for both commercial or military use. The ship was launched in 1975 and turned over to the Maritime Administration for commercial use and acquired by the Lykes Brothers and named the SS Lipscomb Lykes. On June 8th 1976 she was removed from commercial duty and reacquired by the United States Navy and renamed USNS Jupiter to serve alongside USNS Mercury. On 8 June 1976 she was transferred to Military Sealift Command, and renamed the SS Cape Intrepid. Since then the ship has been active in transport roles including a long term attachment to the 833rd Transportation Battalion. She is currently in reserve status and can be activated if called upon in 5 days as part of the ready reserve fleet. The ship is currently moored in Tacoma, Washington.
