= Stephen W. Pless =

United States Marine Corps Medal of Honor recipient (1939–1969)

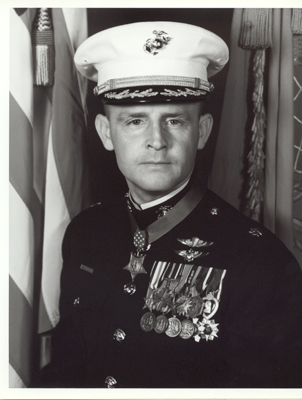
- Major Stephen W. Pless, USMC
- Born: September 6, 1939; Newnan, Georgia, U.S.
- Died: July 20, 1969 (aged 29); Pensacola, Florida, U.S.
- Burial place: Barrancas National Cemetery, Pensacola, Florida
- Military career
- Allegiance: United States of America
- Branch: United States Marine Corps
- Service years: 1956–1969
- Rank: Major
- Unit: Marine Observation Squadron 6
- Conflicts: Vietnam War
- Awards: Medal of Honor; Silver Star; Distinguished Flying Cross; Bronze Star Medal; Purple Heart; Air Medal (38)

Stephen Wesley Pless (September 6, 1939 – July 20, 1969) was a major in the United States Marine Corps during the Vietnam War. He earned the Medal of Honor as a UH-1 Iroquois "Huey" helicopter pilot for rescuing soldiers trapped by heavy enemy fire.

== Childhood ==
Pless was born Stephen Pollard on September 6, 1939, in Newnan, Georgia. After his parents divorced, his mother Nancy Lassetter Pollard moved to Atlanta and remarried, to Berlin Pless. Stephen was adopted by his stepfather and took the Pless surname. He attended Decatur High School in Decatur before transferring to Georgia Military Academy in College Park, graduating from that school in 1957.

== Early career ==
While a senior at Georgia Military Academy, Pless enlisted in the U.S. Marine Corps Reserve on September 6, 1956, and served with the 1st Motor Transport Battalion in Atlanta. After graduation, he attended recruit training and advanced combat training at Parris Island, South Carolina, finishing in October 1957. He then served as an artillery surveyor with the 10th Marine Regiment, 2nd Marine Division, until September 1958.

While attending flight training at Pensacola, Florida, he was commissioned as a second lieutenant on September 16, 1959. He was promoted to first lieutenant on March 16, 1960, and designated a naval aviator upon graduation from flight training on April 20, 1960.

Pless next served successively as squadron pilot with HMR(L)-262, Marine Aircraft Group 26 (MAG-26), at New River, North Carolina; with HMR(L)-264 aboard the USS Boxer (CV-21) and later the USS Wasp (CV-18); again with HMR(L)-262, Marine Aircraft Group 26, at New River; as Assistant Administrative Officer of HMR(L)-262 aboard the USS Shadwell (LSD-15); and as Squadron Adjutant, HMM-162, Marine Aircraft Group 26, at New River.

== Vietnam War ==
Ordered to East Asia in June 1962, he saw duty as Assistant Administrative Officer of HMM-162, MAG-26, in Thailand, and at Da Nang, in the Republic of Vietnam. Upon his return to the United States in June 1963, he reported to Naval Air Station Pensacola in Florida and served as a basic flight instructor, VT-1, and later as Officer in Charge, Aviation Officer Candidate School. He was promoted to captain on July 1, 1964.

After his detachment in April 1966, Pless was assigned duty as Brigade Platoon Commander, 1st ANGLICO, Marine Corps Air Station Kaneohe Bay, Hawaii. In August 1966, he became Officer in Charge, Republic of Korea Detachment, and later Brigade Air Officer, 1st ANGLICO, Sub-Unit 1, with the 2d Brigade Korean Marine Corps, at Chu Lai, in the Republic of Vietnam. For his service in this capacity, he was awarded a Bronze Star Medal and the Korean Order of Military Merit.

From March 20 to September 22, 1967, Pless served in Vietnam as Assistant Operations Officer, VMO-6, Marine Aircraft Group 36, 1st Marine Aircraft Wing. During this time, he earned the Medal of Honor, the Silver Star, the Distinguished Flying Cross, the Purple Heart, and 32 Air Medals.

Over the course of his time in Vietnam, Pless flew a total of 780 combat missions. He was the only Marine aviator awarded the Medal of Honor in the Vietnam War.

== Life after Vietnam ==
After his return from Vietnam, Pless served as an administrative assistant of Aviation Officer Candidate School at Naval Air Station Pensacola, Florida. While serving in that capacity, he was promoted to major on November 7, 1967. On January 16, 1969, four days before leaving office, President Lyndon B. Johnson presented Pless the Medal of Honor at a White House ceremony. Also receiving the Medal of Honor that day was fellow Newnan, Georgia, native Joe M. Jackson, an Air Force pilot who, like Pless, had earned the nation's highest military decoration for an air rescue in Vietnam. Legend states that, upon realizing that both Pless and Jackson were from the same small Georgia town, President Johnson quipped "there must be something in the water down in Newnan".

The Department of Defense, recognizing the extreme circumstances of the helicopter rescue, awarded all three of Pless's crewmates decorations. Rupert Fairfield, Leroy Poulson, and John Phelps were each awarded the Navy Cross, the second highest Naval award for valor. The combined crew of four represent the most highly decorated helicopter crew to fly in the Vietnam War.

Pless died in a motorcycle accident on July 20, 1969, just over six months after receiving the nation's highest award for gallantry in action. While driving across a drawbridge which connected the city of Pensacola to Pensacola Beach, his motorcycle plunged off the end of the open bridge into the water. The center span of the bridge opened horizontally, and Pless did not realize it was open until it was too late. His body was recovered by divers seven hours later. News of his death was overshadowed by the Apollo 11 Moon landing, which occurred the same day.

== Awards and decorations ==
A complete list of his medals and decorations include the Medal of Honor, the Silver Star, the Distinguished Flying Cross, the Bronze Star, the Purple Heart, 38 Air Medals, the Navy Commendation Medal with valor device, the National Defense Service Medal, the Marine Corps Expeditionary Medal, the Armed Forces Expeditionary Medal, the Korean Order of Military Merit, the Vietnam Service Medal, and the Vietnam Campaign Medal.

His decorations include:

Naval Aviator Badge
Navy and Marine Corps Parachutist Insignia
Medal of Honor	Silver Star	Distinguished Flying Cross
Bronze Star w/ ”V” device	Purple Heart	Air Medal w/ one 5/16" Gold Star and Strike/Flight numerals 36
Navy and Marine Corps Commendation Medal w/ “V” device	Combat Action Ribbon	Navy Presidential Unit Citation
Navy Unit Commendation	Marine Corps Expeditionary Medal	National Defense Service Medal
Armed Forces Expeditionary Medal	Vietnam Service Medal w/ three 3/16" bronze stars	Order of Military Merit (Korea); 4th Class
Republic of Vietnam Gallantry Cross w/ one 5/16" Gold Star	Republic of Vietnam Gallantry Cross Unit Citation w/ Palm and Frame	Vietnam Campaign Medal

=== Medal of Honor citation ===
Rank and organization: Major (then Capt.), U.S. Marine Corps, VMO-6, MAG-36, 1st Marine Aircraft Wing. Place and date: Near Quang Nai, Republic of Vietnam, August 19, 1967. Entered service at: Atlanta, Ga. Born: September 6, 1939, Newnan, Ga.

Citation:

For conspicuous gallantry and intrepidity at the risk of his life above and beyond the call of duty while serving as a helicopter gunship pilot attached to Marine Observation Squadron 6 in action against enemy forces. During an escort mission Maj. Pless monitored an emergency call that 4 American soldiers stranded on a nearby beach were being overwhelmed by a large Viet Cong force. Maj. Pless flew to the scene and found 30 to 50 enemy soldiers in the open. Some of the enemy were bayoneting and beating the downed Americans. Maj. Pless displayed exceptional airmanship as he launched a devastating attack against the enemy force, killing or wounding many of the enemy and driving the remainder back into a treeline. His rocket and machinegun attacks were made at such low levels that the aircraft flew through debris created by explosions from its rockets. Seeing 1 of the wounded soldiers gesture for assistance, he maneuvered his helicopter into a position between the wounded men and the enemy, providing a shield which permitted his crew to retrieve the wounded. During the rescue the enemy directed intense fire at the helicopter and rushed the aircraft again and again, closing to within a few feet before being beaten back. When the wounded men were aboard, Maj. Pless maneuvered the helicopter out to sea. Before it became safely airborne, the overloaded aircraft settled 4 times into the water. Displaying superb airmanship, he finally got the helicopter aloft. Major Pless' extraordinary heroism coupled with his outstanding flying skill prevented the annihilation of the tiny force. His courageous actions reflect great credit upon himself and uphold the highest traditions of the Marine Corps and the U.S. Naval Service.

=== Silver Star citation ===
Citation:

The President of the United States of America takes pleasure in presenting the Silver Star to Captain Stephen Wesley Pless (MCSN: 0-79156), United States Marine Corps, for conspicuous gallantry and intrepidity in action while serving as a Pilot with Marine Observation Squadron SIX (VMO-6), Marine Aircraft Group Thirty-Six (MAG-36), FIRST Marine Aircraft Wing, in connection with combat operations against insurgent communist (Viet Cong) forces in the Republic of Vietnam during the period 2 to 4 June 1967. On 2 June, Captain Pless launched as Section Leader of two UH-1E armed helicopters escorting five Marine CH-56 aircraft and nine Army of the Republic of Vietnam UH-34 transport helicopters assigned the mission of inserting a two platoon size force deep within enemy controlled territory south of Khe Sanh. The operation, in support of the U.S. Army Special Forces, Special Operations Group, was conducted to assess the damage of a large scale bombing attack. Throughout the three-day operation, Captain Pless and his crew repeatedly came under heavy small arms and automatic weapons fire as they determinedly provided supporting fire for the besieged ground troops which had been surrounded by a numerically superior enemy force. Returning to the insertion site on eight separate occasions and even though his aircraft received severe damage from enemy ground fire on three different passes over the hostile positions, he steadfastly continued to provide outstanding support. While making a low altitude ordnance run over the Viet Cong positions, an enemy round struck the aircraft's starboard rocket pod, causing the pod to burst into flames. In an attempt to jettison the pod, Captain Pless activated the electrical and manual release systems, however the pod failed to jettison. Displaying calm presence of mind, he maneuvered his aircraft in preparation for another attack heading and subsequently commenced his firing runs when the crew safely released the burning rockets from the helicopter. Despite severe thunderstorms over the target area and although several aircraft were downed by enemy fire, Captain Pless resolutely ignored the hazardous conditions to deliver effective suppressive fire on the Viet Cong emplacements. In addition, he assisted the Tactical Air Controller (Airborne) and thoroughly briefed other helicopter and fixed-wing aircraft pilots on the disposition of enemy and friendly units as they arrived on station. In large measure due to his analysis and comprehensive knowledge of the tactical situation, he was instrumental in planning the extraction of the friendly forces from the embattles area. During the retraction operation, Captain Pless led a five aircraft division of UH-1E helicopters into the fire-swept zone, utilizing the fire power of his aerial gunner after he had expended all his ordnance on the enemy positions. By his determined fighting spirit, exceptional aeronautical ability and courageous actions despite seemingly insurmountable obstacles, Captain Pless contributed significantly to the successful accomplishment of the mission and upheld the highest traditions of the Marine Corps and of the United States Naval Service.

== Posthumous honors ==
The United States Navy honored Pless by naming a Maritime Prepositioning ship after him. The United States Marine Corps honored Major Pless by naming the Headquarters Building at Marine Corps Air Station Camp Pendleton, CA after him. Dedicated in the 1970s, the Jackson-Pless National Guard Armory in Newnan, Georgia honors both of the town's Medal of Honor recipients.

A Sgt. Matej Kocak-class cargo ship of the US Navy's Military Sealift Command is named after him, USNS Maj. Stephen W. Pless (T-AK-3007).

The Huey helicopter which Pless flew during his Medal of Honor mission is on display at the National Museum of the Marine Corps in Quantico, Virginia.

The Collings Foundation, of Stow, Massachusetts, currently owns and operates a VMO-6 UH-1E Huey flown by Pless in combat. This aircraft is a sistership to the MOH aircraft on display at Quantico. It is based in Houston, Texas with other aircraft of the Collings Foundation Viet Nam Memorial Flight. It is flown at airshows and special events.

In 2012 Pless was inducted into the Georgia Aviation Hall of Fame.

A mess hall aboard Marine Corps Base Hawaii was named in his honor.

== Images ==
A memorial to Major Pless stands outside the Coweta County Courthouse in Newnan, GA

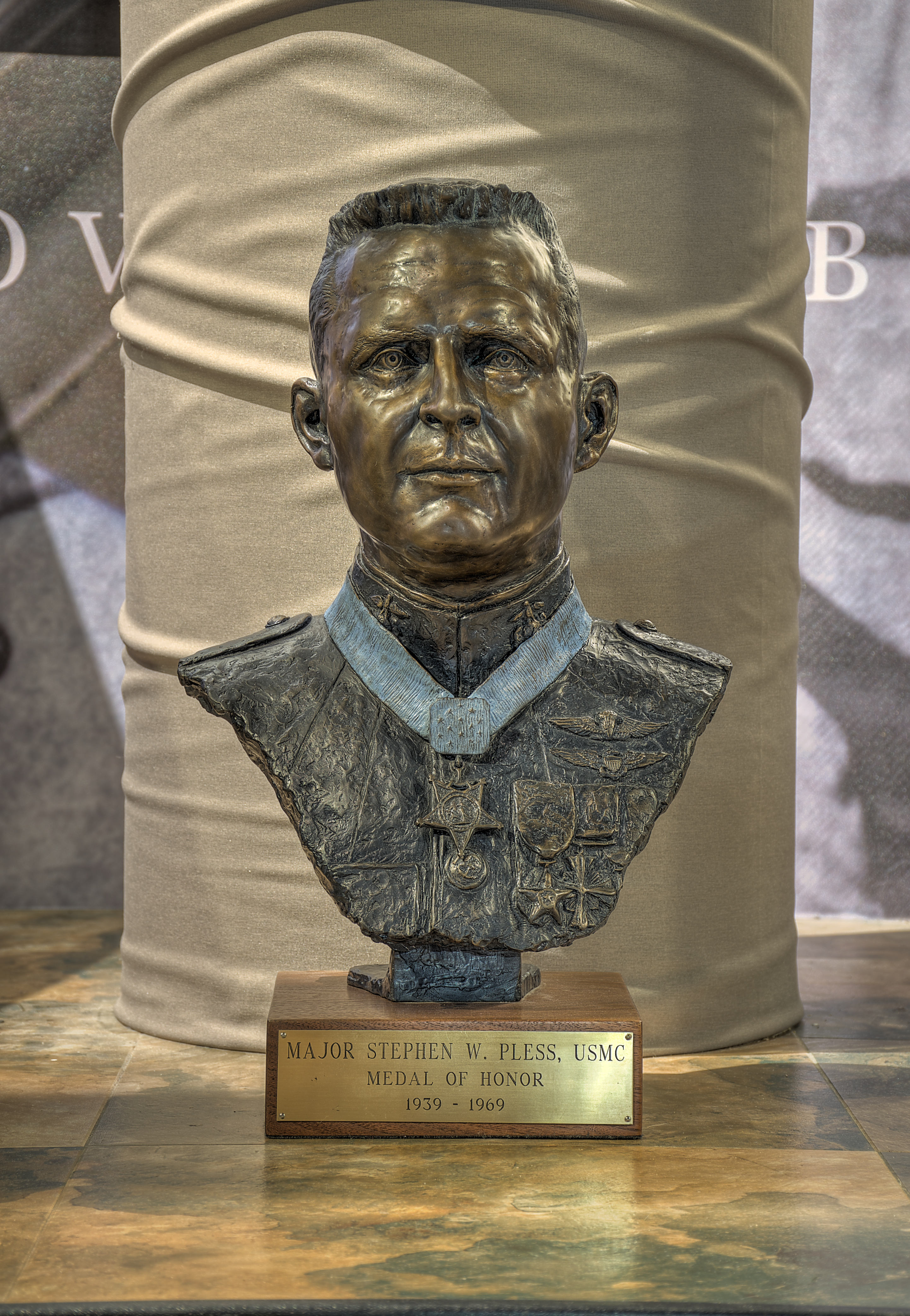
Bust of Maj. Pless at the Museum of Aviation, Robins AFB

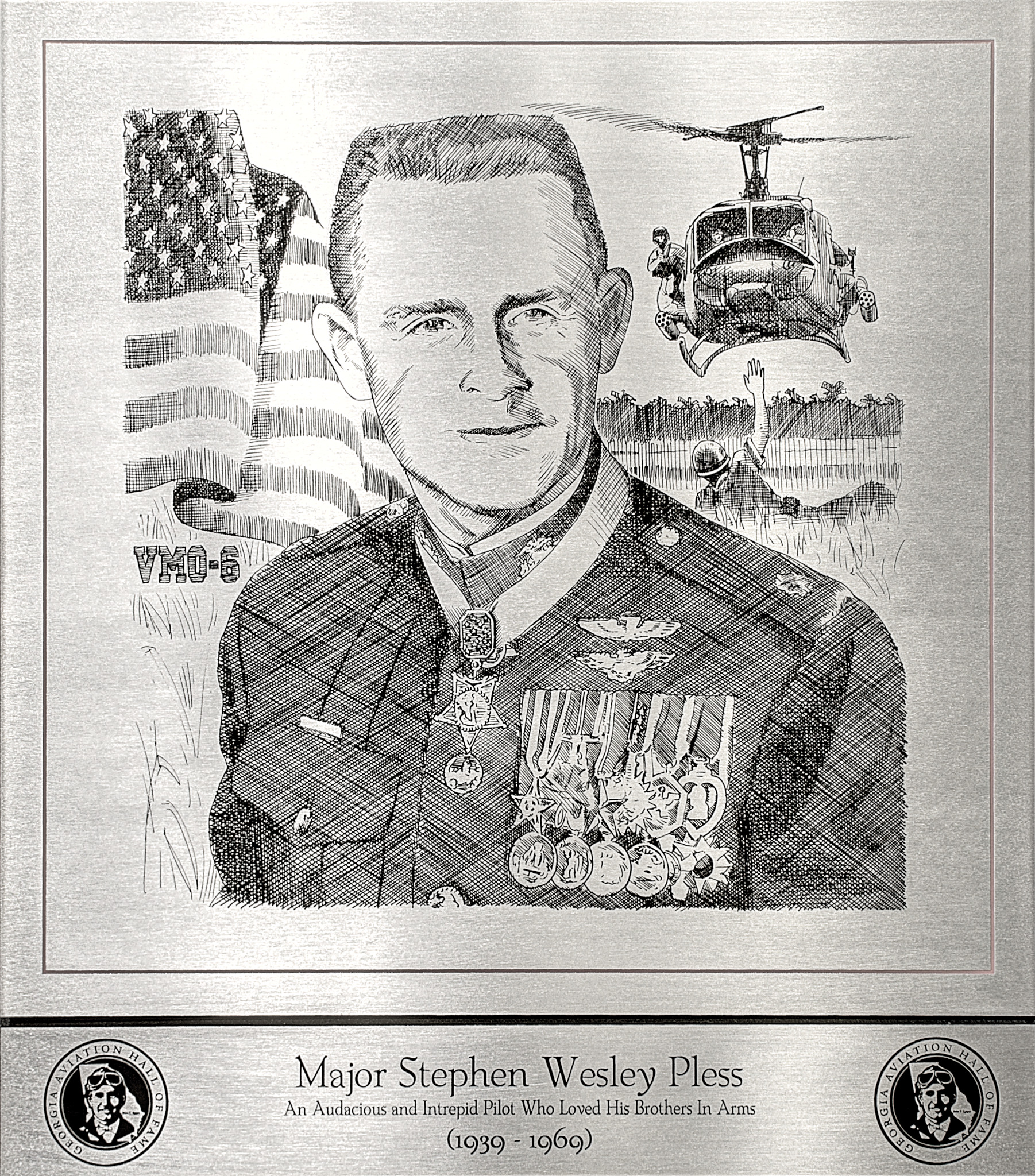
Plaque of Maj. Pless at the Georgia Aviation Hall of Fame

== See also ==
- List of Medal of Honor recipients for the Vietnam War
