= Roy M. Wheat =

Roy Mitchell Wheat
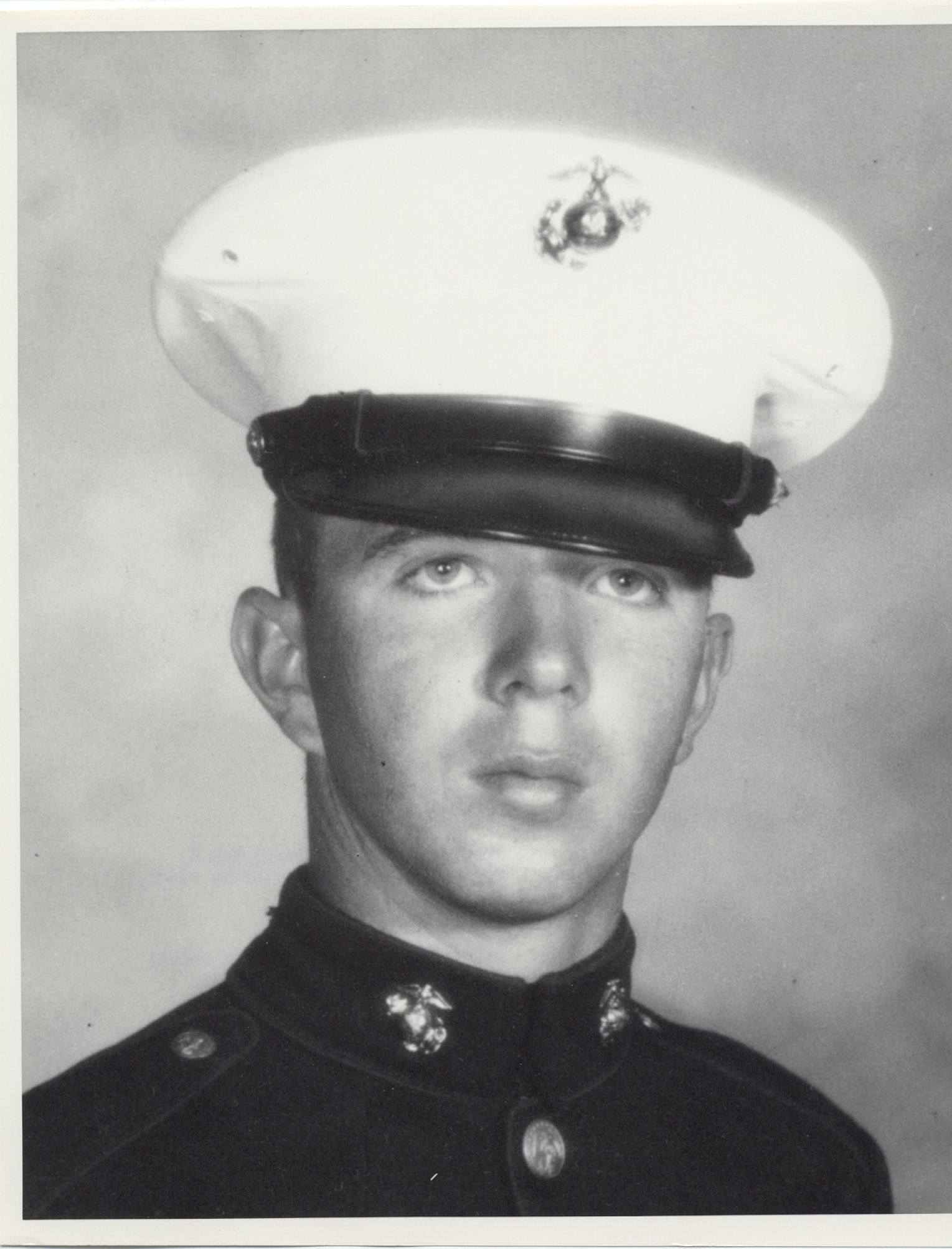
- Roy M. Wheat, Medal of Honor recipient
- Born: July 24, 1947; Moselle, Mississippi, U.S.
- Died: August 11, 1967 (aged 20); Dien Ban District, Quảng Nam Province, Republic of Vietnam
- Burial place: Eastabuchie Cemetery, Eastabuchie, Mississippi
- Military career
- Allegiance: United States of America
- Branch: United States Marine Corps
- Service years: 1966–1967
- Rank: Lance Corporal
- Units: Company K, 3rd Battalion, 7th Marines, 1st Marine Division
- Conflicts: Vietnam War †
- Awards: Medal of Honor; Purple Heart

Roy Mitchell Wheat (July 24, 1947 – August 11, 1967) was a United States Marine who posthumously received the Medal of Honor for his actions in the Vietnam War.

== Biography ==
Wheat was born on July 24, 1947, in Moselle, Mississippi. He attended public schools in Ellisville, Mississippi, but dropped out in 1965 after two years of high school.

In September 1966, he enlisted in the United States Marine Corps at Jackson, Mississippi. Wheat then reported to Marine Corps Recruit Depot Parris Island, South Carolina. He underwent recruit training with the 2nd Recruit Training Battalion, after which he completed special infantry training with the 1st Infantry Training Battalion, Camp Lejeune, North Carolina. Upon completion of infantry training, he was promoted to private first class in February 1967.

Wheat arrived in Vietnam in March 1967, and was assigned duty as a rifleman with Company K, 3rd Battalion, 7th Marines, 1st Marine Division. His unit participated in numerous combat operations, including Operation Desoto in the Đức Phổ District, Quảng Ngãi Province, and Operations Webster, Arizona, Butler and Gem in Quảng Nam Province. He was promoted to lance corporal in June 1967.

On August 11, 1967, Wheat and two other Marines were assigned to provide security for a Navy construction battalion crane and crew operating along Liberty Road in Dien Ban District, Quảng Nam Province. After setting up in the tree line adjacent to the work site, Wheat searched the surrounding area for guerrilla fighters. He had returned to within 10 feet (3.0 m) of the security post when he triggered a well-concealed bounding mine. Hearing the distinctive hiss of the mine's fuse, Wheat shouted a warning to his two fellow Marines and then threw himself on the device, smothering its blast with his body. He was killed in the ensuing explosion. For this act, he was awarded the Medal of Honor. Wheat is buried at Eastabuchie Cemetery, in Eastabuchie, Mississippi.

== Awards and decorations ==
Wheat was buried at Eastabuchie Cemetery in Eastabuchie, Mississippi. His name can be found on the Vietnam Veterans Memorial on Panel 24E, Row 101.

In 2003, the U.S. Navy named its newest prepositioning ship the USNS LCPL Roy M. Wheat (T-AK-3016). The enlisted dining facility at Naval Air Station Meridian in Mississippi was named after him in 1985, and Interstate 59 in Mississippi was named the "Roy Wheat Memorial Highway".

Wheat's military decorations include the Medal of Honor, the Navy Commendation Medal, the Purple Heart with one gold award star, the National Defense Service Medal, the Vietnam Service Medal with two bronze service stars, the Vietnamese Military Merit Medal, the Vietnamese Gallantry Cross with palm, and the Vietnam Campaign Medal.

Medal of Honor	Navy and Marine Corps Commendation Medal	Purple Heart with gold star	National Defense Service Medal
Vietnam Service Medal with two bronze star	Vietnam Military Merit Medal	Vietnam Gallantry Cross with Palm	Republic of Vietnam Campaign Medal

== Medal of Honor citation ==
The President of the United States takes pride in presenting the MEDAL OF HONOR posthumously to

LANCE CORPORAL ROY M. WHEAT
UNITED STATES MARINE CORPS

for service as set forth in the following CITATION:

For conspicuous gallantry and intrepidity at the risk of his life above and beyond the call of duty. L/Cpl. Wheat and 2 other marines were assigned the mission of providing security for a Navy construction battalion crane and crew operating along Liberty Road in the vicinity of the Dien Ban District, Quang Nam Province. After the marines had set up security positions in a tree line adjacent to the work site, L/Cpl. Wheat reconnoitered the area to the rear of their location for the possible presence of guerrillas. He then returned to within 10 feet of the friendly position, and here unintentionally triggered a well concealed, bounding type, antipersonnel mine. Immediately, a hissing sound was heard which was identified by the 3 marines as that of a burning time fuse. Shouting a warning to his comrades, L/Cpl. Wheat in a valiant act of heroism hurled himself upon the mine, absorbing the tremendous impact of the explosion with his body. The inspirational personal heroism and extraordinary valor of his unselfish action saved his fellow marines from certain injury and possible death, reflected great credit upon himself, and upheld the highest traditions of the Marine Corps and the U.S. Naval Service. He gallantly gave his life for his country.

/S/ LYNDON B. JOHNSON

== See also ==
- USNS LCPL Roy M. Wheat, a former Military Sealift Command cargo ship named in his honor.
- List of Medal of Honor recipients for the Vietnam War
