= Eugene A. Obregon =

United States Marine Corps Medal of Honor recipient

Eugene Arnold Obregon
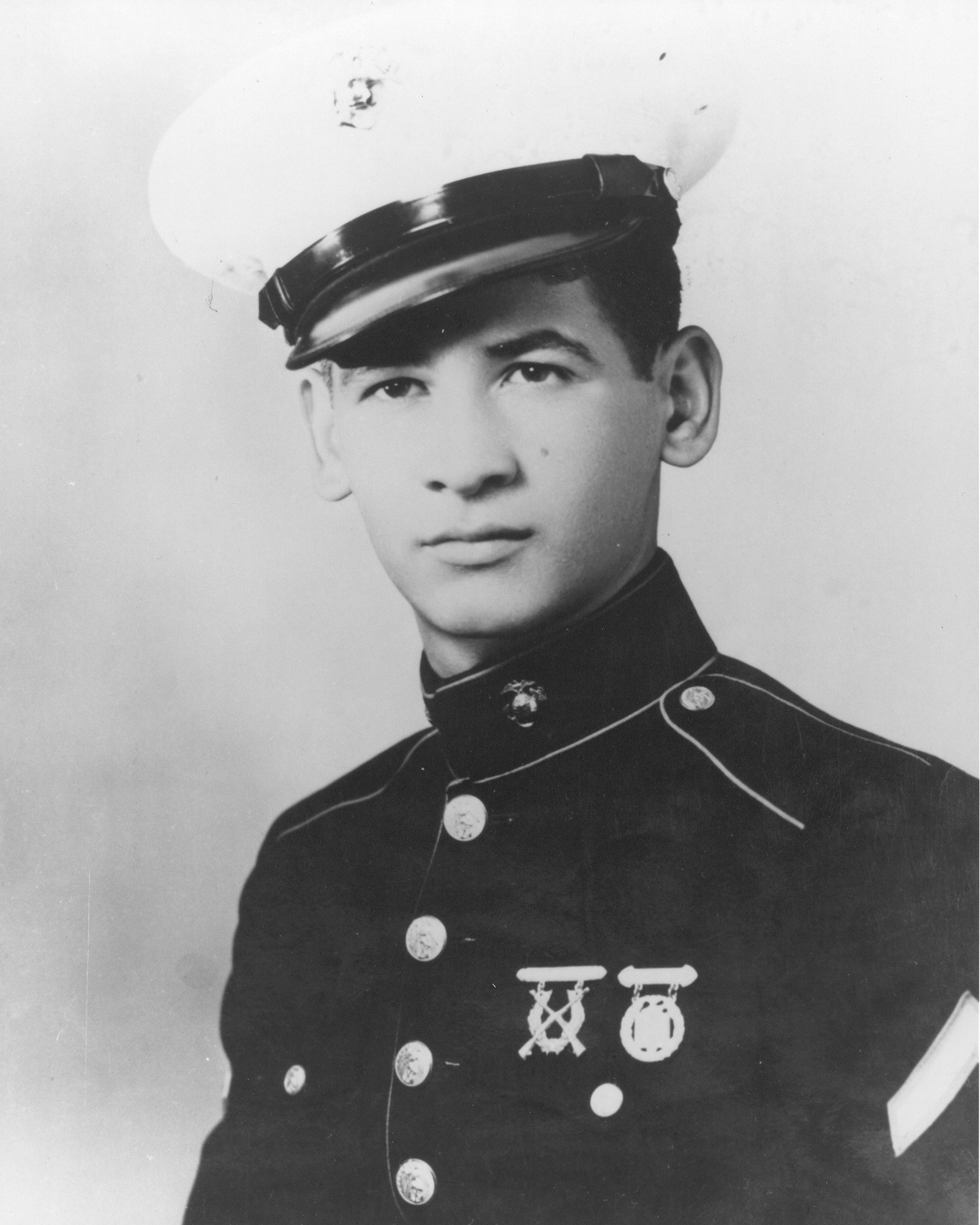
- Eugene A. Obregon, posthumous Medal of Honor recipient
- Born: November 12, 1930; Los Angeles, California
- Died: September 26, 1950 (aged 19) near Seoul, Korea
- Burial place: Calvary Cemetery, Los Angeles, California
- Military career
- Allegiance: United States of America
- Branch: United States Marine Corps
- Service years: 1948–1950
- Rank: Private First Class
- Units: Company G, 3rd Battalion, 5th Marines, 1st Marine Division
- Conflicts: Korean War: Battle of Pusan Perimeter; First Battle of Naktong Bulge; Battle of Inchon; Second Battle of Seoul (DOW)
- Awards: Medal of Honor; Purple Heart

Eugene Arnold Obregon (November 12, 1930 – September 26, 1950) was a United States Marine who was posthumously awarded the United States' highest military decoration for valor — the Medal of Honor — for sacrificing his life to save that of a wounded comrade during the Second Battle of Seoul. On September 26, 1950, Private First Class Obregon was fatally wounded by enemy machine gun fire while using his body to shield a wounded fellow Marine.

== Early years ==
Eugene Arnold Obregon, who was of Mexican American descent, was born on November 12, 1930, in Los Angeles, California. He attended elementary school and Theodore Roosevelt High School in Los Angeles before enlisting in the United States Marine Corps on June 7, 1948, at the age of 17.

Following recruit training at Marine Corps Recruit Depot San Diego, California, he was assigned to the Marine Corps Supply Depot in Barstow, California, where he served as a fireman until the outbreak of the Korean War. He was transferred to the 1st Marine Provisional Brigade and served as a machine gun ammunition carrier. His unit departed the United States on July 14, 1950, and arrived at Pusan, Korea on August 3, 1950.

He was in action by August 8, 1950, along the Naktong River, and participated in the Inchon landing. Then, on September 26, 1950, during the assault on the city of Seoul he was killed in action while using his body to shield a wounded fellow Marine. For this action, he was posthumously awarded the Medal of Honor.

The Medal of Honor was presented to PFC Obregon's parents by Secretary of the Navy Daniel A. Kimball on August 30, 1951.

The wounded comrade was PFC Bert M. Johnson, 19, of Grand Prairie, Texas. He was hospitalized, recovered, and returned to duty in the United States at Camp Lejeune, North Carolina.

== Medal of Honor ==
Medal of Honor citation:

The President of the United States takes pride in presenting the MEDAL OF HONOR posthumously to

PRIVATE FIRST CLASS EUGENE A. OBREGON
UNITED STATES MARINE CORPS

for service as set forth in the following CITATION:

For conspicuous gallantry and intrepidity at the risk of his life above and beyond the call of duty while serving with Company G, Third Battalion, Fifth Marines, First Marine Division (Reinforced), in action against enemy aggressor forces at Seoul, Korea, on September 26, 1950. While serving as an ammunition carrier of a machine gun squad in a Marine Rifle Company which was temporarily pinned down by hostile fire, Private First Class Obregon observed a fellow Marine fall wounded in the line of fire. Armed only with a pistol, he unhesitatingly dashed from his covered position to the side of the casualty. Firing his pistol with one hand as he ran, he grasped his comrade by the arm with his other hand and, despite the great peril to himself, dragged him to the side of the road. Still under enemy fire, he was bandaging the man's wounds when hostile troops of approximately platoon strength began advancing toward his position. Quickly seizing the wounded Marine's carbine, he placed his own body as a shield in front of him and lay there firing accurately and effectively into the hostile group until he himself was fatally wounded by enemy machine-gun fire. By his courageous fighting spirit, fortitude and loyal devotion to duty, Private First Class Obregon enabled his fellow Marines to rescue the wounded man and aided essentially in repelling the attack, thereby sustaining the highest traditions of the United States Naval Service. He gallantly gave his life for his country. /S/ HARRY S. TRUMAN

== Decorations ==
In addition to the Medal of Honor, PFC Obregon also was posthumously awarded the Purple Heart, Presidential Unit Citation, Korean Service Medal with three bronze stars and the United Nations Service Medal.

Medal of Honor		Purple Heart
Presidential Unit Citation	Korean Service Medal with three bronze stars	United Nations Service Medal

== Foundation ==
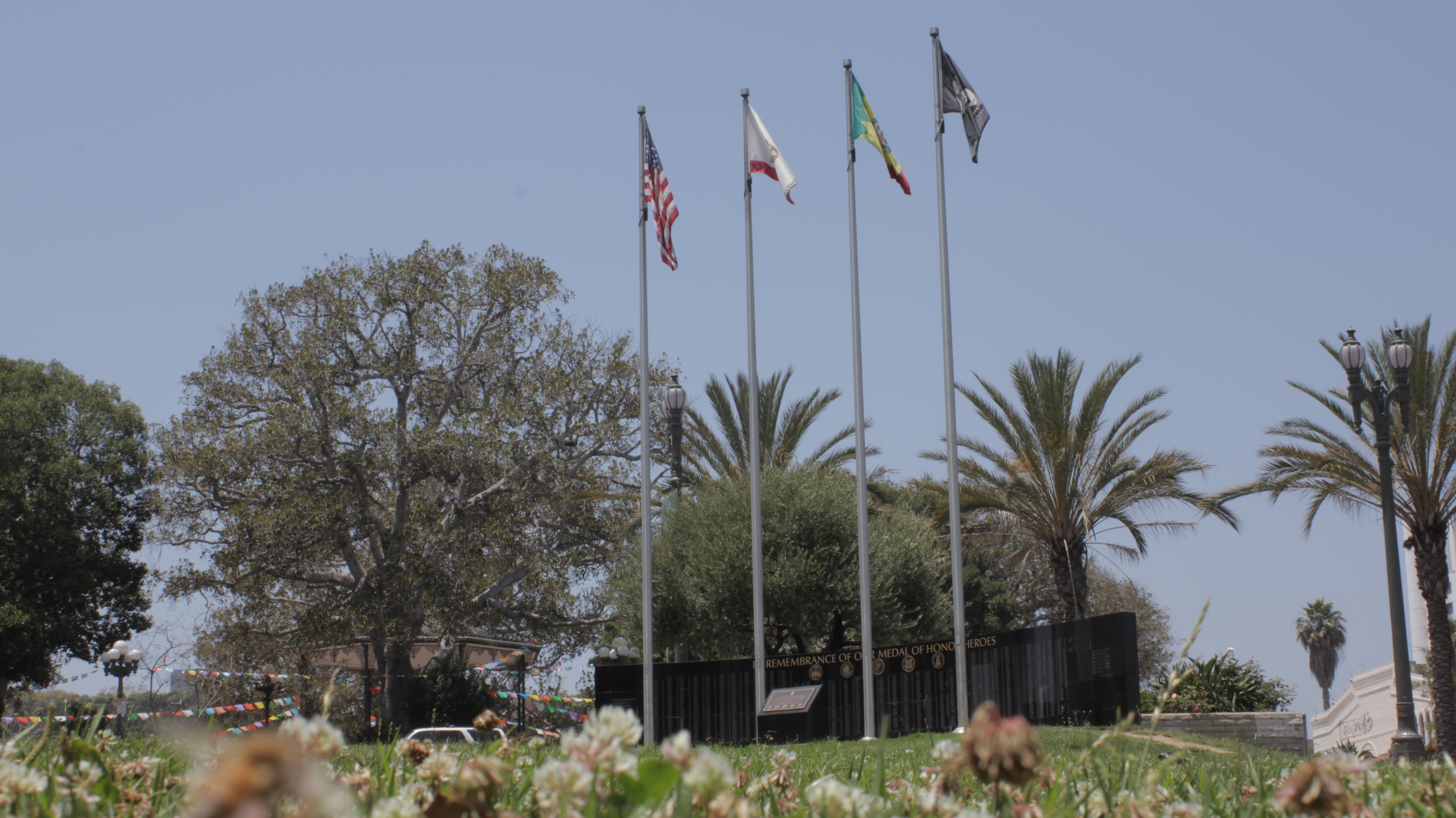
Eugene A. Obregon Medal of Honor Monument's "Wall Of Honor" in Los Angeles, CA

The Eugene A. Obregon Congressional Medal of Honor Foundation is building a Medal of Honor Monument complex located in the heart of Los Angeles's historic birthplace known as "El Pueblo". Work began in 2009 on a 36' long, curved granite wall that bears the inscribe names of all of the nearly 3,500 Medal Of Honor recipients awarded throughout American history. The organization also plans to erect a bronze sculpture of Obregon in recognition of Latino recipients and his sacrifice for his fellow Marines.

== Namesakes and honors ==
A US Navy ship, a school, a Marine Corps barracks, an American Legion post, and three parks have been named in honor of Medal of Honor recipient Eugene Obregon.

- The Maritime Prepositioning ship USNS PFC Eugene A. Obregon (T-AK-3006) entered into service in January 1985.
- In 1966, the new Eugene A. Obregon Elementary School in Pico Rivera, California, was named for Eugene A. Obregon.
- Obregon Park, just outside the main gate of the Marine Corps Logistics Base Barstow Yermo Annex, in Barstow, California, is named in honor of Obregon.
- The East Los Angeles Interchange was named the Eugene A. Obregon Memorial Interchange, to honor Eugene A. Obregon.
- A monument in Pershing Square, in Downtown Los Angeles is dedicated in honor of Obregon.
- Obregon Road, on Marine Corps Air Station Miramar has been named for Obregon.
- On Flag Day 2001, Eugene Obregon Park in Pico Rivera, California was dedicated in his memory, in June.
- Eugene A. Obregon Park, in East Los Angeles, is the first Los Angeles County reclaimed water and sustainable landscaping designed regional park.

== See also ==
- List of Korean War Medal of Honor recipients
- List of Hispanic Medal of Honor recipients
- Hispanics in the United States Marine Corps
