= Matej Kocak =

Double recipient of the Medal of Honor

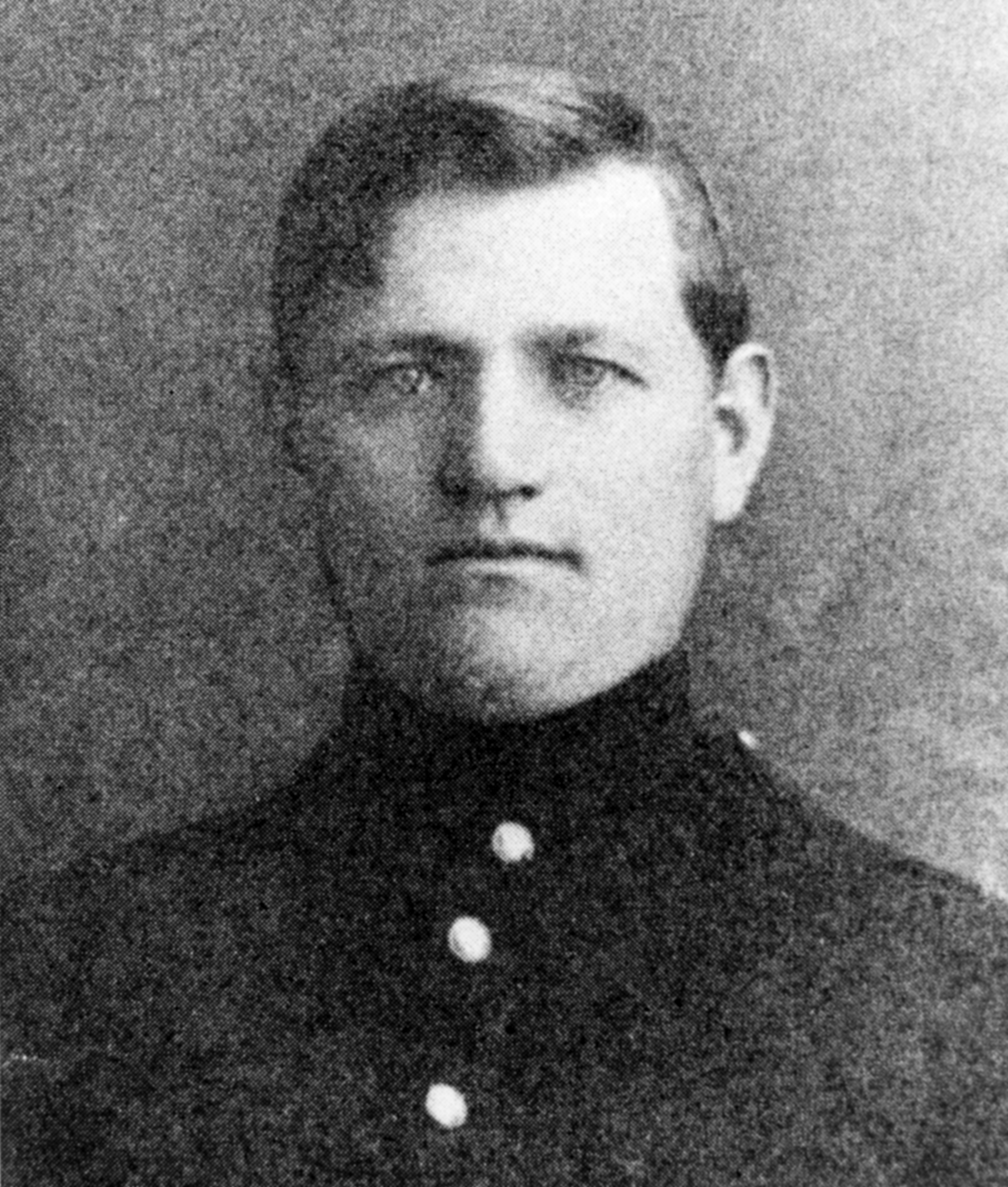
- Double recipient of the Medal of Honor
- Born: December 3, 1882; Egbell, Austria-Hungary
- Died: October 4, 1918 (aged 35); Blanc Mont Ridge, Champagne, France
- Burial place: Meuse-Argonne American Cemetery and Memorial Romagne, France
- Military career
- Allegiance: United States of America
- Branch: United States Marine Corps
- Service years: 1907–1918
- Rank: Sergeant
- Unit: 5th Marine Regiment
- Conflicts: World War I: Battle of Belleau Wood; Battle of Soissons; Battle of Blanc Mont Ridge †
- Awards: Medal of Honor (1 Army, 1 Navy); Silver Star; Purple Heart

Matej Kocak (December 3, 1882 – October 4, 1918), a United States Marine Corps sergeant, was posthumously awarded both the Army and Navy Medals of Honor, for "heroism above and beyond the call of duty" in action against the enemy on July 18, 1918. Less than three months after his act of heroism he was killed in action by enemy gunfire in the Battle of Blanc Mont Ridge in France while serving as a member of the 66th Company, 5th Regiment.

== Biography ==
Matej Kocak was born in Egbell, Austria-Hungary (today Gbely, Slovakia), in 1882. He emigrated to the United States in 1906, and on October 16, 1907, enlisted in the Marine Corps in Pittsburgh, Pennsylvania, and began his 11-year Marine Corps career at Marine Barracks, League Island, Pennsylvania. He was discharged on October 16, 1911, at the expiration of his first enlistment but reenlisted in New York City on December 26, 1911, and was assigned to the Marine Barracks, Navy Yard, New York, for duty. For some time he lived in Binghamton, New York, where a large Slovak community used to live. He was member of Slovak Catholic Sokol in this town.

During his second enlistment, he served with the U.S. Army at Vera Cruz, Mexico, from April 30, to November 23, 1914. His enlistment ended on December 25, 1915, at Marine Barracks, New York, New York, but he again reenlisted and transferred to Marine Barracks, Naval Station, New Orleans, Louisiana.

The following year, he was ashore in Santo Domingo, Dominican Republic, where he participated in skirmishes with native bandits in Las Canitas, Azua Province, Dominican Republic. Appointed to the rank of corporal March 23, 1917, he then returned to the United States where he joined the 12th Company at Quantico, Virginia.

By December 31, 1917, he was again overseas, this time at St. Nazaire, France. The following January 23, 1918, he joined the 66th Company, 5th Regiment, and on June 1, 1918, was promoted to sergeant and then took part in the attack against the enemy in Bois De Belleau Bouresches sector northwest of Chateau Thierry, France. On July 18, 1918, he participated in the attack at Villers Cotteret Wood south of Soissons, France, and it was on this day he performed the act of heroism for which he was posthumously awarded both the Army and Navy Medal of Honor.

October 4, 1918, found him taking part in the Allied drive against the enemy in the Argonne Forest between the Moselle and Forest of Argonne in the vicinity of Blanchmont in Champagne, France, and in the attack against the enemy in the St. Mihiel sector in the vicinity of Thiaucourt, France. He was killed in action on October 4, 1918, and is buried in the Meuse-Argonne American Cemetery, Romagne, France.

== Medal of Honor Citations ==
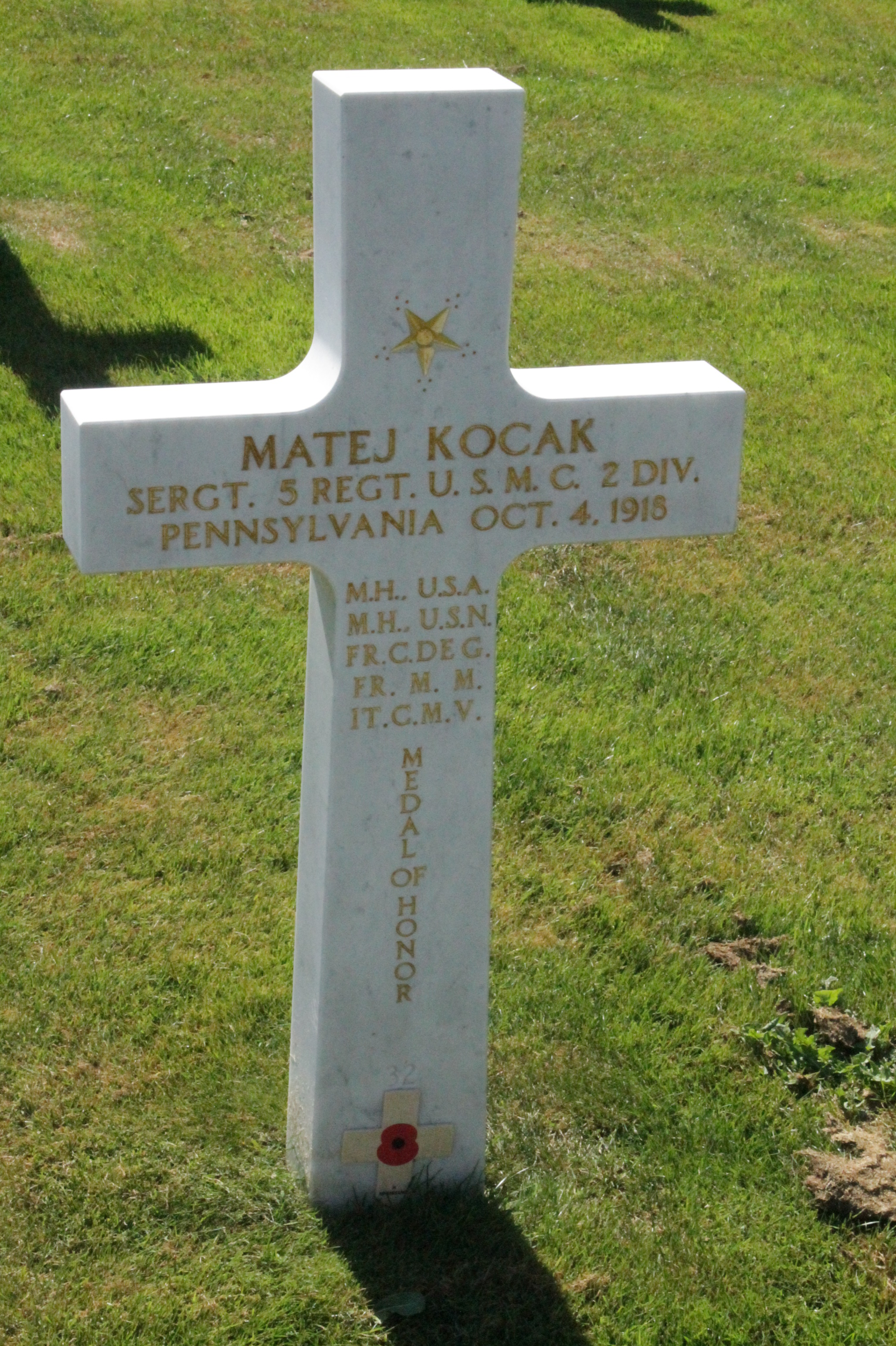
The grave of Matej Kocak, Meuse-Argonne American Cemetery, France

Sergeant Kocak was one of five Marines during World War I to be awarded both the Army and Navy Medals of Honor. Two Medals of Honor may no longer be given for a single incident.

Army Medal of Honor

Rank and organization: Sergeant, U.S. Marine Corps, 66th Company, 5th Regiment (Marines), 2nd Division, American Expeditionary Forces. Born: December 31, 1882, Egbell, Austria. Accredited to: New York. (Also received Navy Medal of Honor). Action date: July 18, 1918. War Department, General Orders No. 34 (March 7, 1919)

Citation:

When the advance of his battalion was checked by a hidden machine-gun nest, he went forward alone, unprotected by covering fire from his own men, and worked in between the German positions in the face of fire from enemy covering detachments. Locating the machine-gun nest, he rushed it and with his bayonet drove off the crew. Shortly after this he organized 25 French colonial soldiers who had become separated from their company and led them in attacking another machine-gun nest, which was also put out of action.

Navy Medal of Honor

Rank and organization: Sergeant, U.S. Marine Corps, 66th Company, 5th Regiment (Marines), 2nd Division, American Expeditionary Forces. Born: December 31, 1882, Egbell, Austria. Accredited to: New York. (Also received Army Medal of Honor). Action date: July 18, 1918. General Orders, Navy Department.

Citation:

For extraordinary heroism while serving with the Sixty-sixth Company, Fifth Regiment, Second Division, in action in the Villers-Cotterêts section, south of Soissons, France, 18 July 1918. When a hidden machine-gun nest halted the advance of his battalion, Sergeant Kocak went forward alone unprotected by covering fire and worked his way in between the German positions in the face of heavy enemy fire. Rushing the enemy position with his bayonet, he drove off the crew. Later the same day, Sergeant Kocak organized French colonial soldiers who had become separated from their company and led them in an attack on another machine-gun nest which was also put out of action.

== Silver Star Citation ==
Rank and organization: Sergeant, U.S. Marine Corps, 66th Company, 5th Regiment (Marines), 2nd Division, American Expeditionary Forces. Born: December 31, 1882, Egbell, Austria. Action dates: July 18–22, 1918. General Orders: Citation Orders, 2d Division, American Expeditionary Forces.

Citation:

By direction of the President, under the provisions of the act of Congress approved July 9, 1918 (Bul. No. 43, W.D. 1918), Sergeant Matej Kocak (MCSN: 72825), United States Marine Corps, is cited (Posthumously) by the Commanding General, SECOND DIVISION, American Expeditionary Forces, for gallantry in action and a silver star may be placed upon the ribbon of the Victory Medals awarded him. Sergeant Kocak distinguished himself while serving with the 66th Company, Fifth Regiment (Marines), 2d Division, American Expeditionary Forces at Soissons, France, 18 to 22 July 1918.

== Military Awards ==
Kocak's military decorations and awards include:

1st row	Medal of Honor (Two Awards)		
2nd row	Silver Star	Purple Heart	Marine Corps Good Conduct Medal
3rd row	Mexican Service Medal	Dominican Campaign Medal	World War I Victory Medal w/ one silver service star to denote credit for the Aisne, Aisne-Marne, St. Mihiel, Meuse-Argonne and Defensive Sector battle clasps.
4th row	Médaille militaire (French Republic)	Croix de guerre 1914–1918 with bronze palm (French Republic)	Croce al Merito di Guerra (Italy)
Unit Award	French Fourragère – Authorized permanent wear based on two French Croix de Guerre with Palm and one French Croix de Guerre with Gold Star unit citations awarded to 5th Marines in WWI.		

== See also ==
- USNS Sgt. Matej Kocak (T-AK-3005)
- List of Medal of Honor recipients
- List of Medal of Honor recipients for World War I
