= USNS LCPL Roy M. Wheat =

LCPL Roy M. Wheat-class dry cargo ship

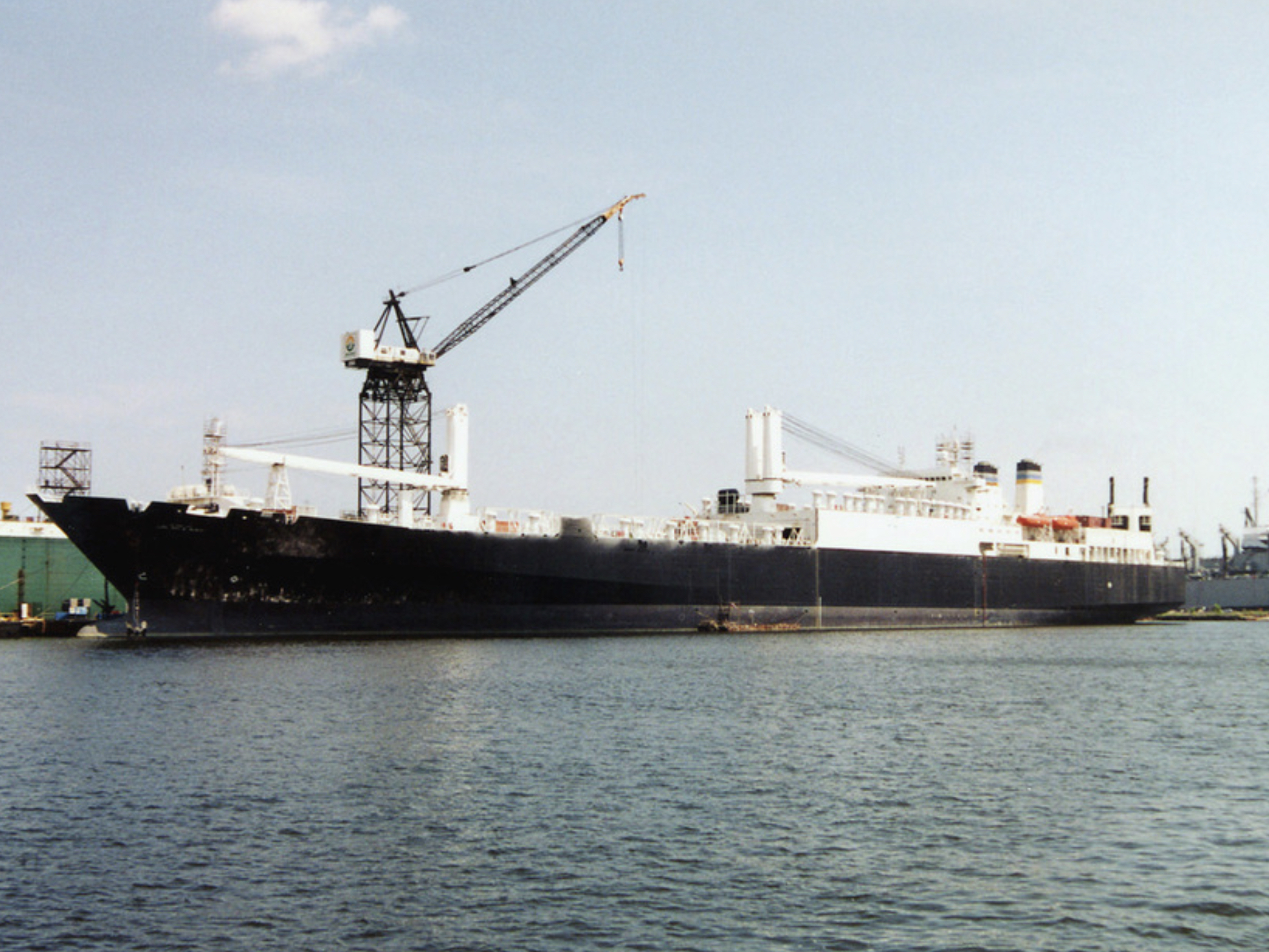
- USNS LCPL Roy M. Wheat

History

United States
- Name: LCPL Roy M. Wheat
- Namesake: Roy M. Wheat
- Owner: Black Sea Shipping Co. (1987–1997); Military Sealift Command (1997–present)
- Builder: Chernomorski Shipyard
- Laid down: 1 July 1983
- In service: 15 August 1987
- Out of service: 30 December 2021
- Renamed: GTS Vladimir Vaslyayev (1987-1996); GTS Bazaliya (1996-1997)
- Stricken: 30 December 2021
- Identification: IMO number: 8523137; MMSI number: 303956000; Callsign: NROY; Hull number: T-AK-3016
- Honours and awards: See Awards
- Fate: Inactivated as part of the James River Reserve Fleet
- Status: Stricken

General characteristics
- Class & type: LCPL Roy M. Wheat-class cargo ship
- Displacement: 15,804 t (15,554 long tons), light; 44,302 t (43,602 long tons), full
- Length: 864 ft 0 in (263.35 m)
- Beam: 98 ft 05 in (30.00 m)
- Draft: 34 ft 11 in (10.64 m)
- Installed power: 2 × shafts; 38,400 hp (28,600 kW)
- Propulsion: 2 × CPGAS turbine engines
- Speed: 22 knots (41 km/h; 25 mph)
- Range: 1,600 nmi (3,000 km; 1,800 mi)
- Capacity: 114,924 sq. ft. vehicle; 25,000 gallons water; 996 TEU
- Complement: 39 mariners
- Aviation facilities: Helipad

USNS LCPL Roy M. Wheat (T-AK-3016), the only ship of its class, is a cargo ship built in 1987. She became one of the only Soviet ships to enter United States service. The ship is named after Lance Corporal Roy M. Wheat, an American Marine who was awarded the Medal of Honor during Vietnam War.

== Construction and commissioning ==
The ship was built in 1987 at the Chernomorski Shipyard, Nikolaiev, Mykolaiv Oblast. She was put into the service of Black Sea Shipping Company.

In 1997, the ship was purchased by the Military Sealift Command and following conversion was placed in Prepositioning Program and the Maritime Prepositioning Ship Squadron 1 on 7 October 2003. The conversion process included a 118 ft midbody hull extension, the installation of two cargo cranes, installation of fore and aft garages, strengthening and increasing the length of the stern ramp, a stern helicopter deck, conversion of the electrical system from 50 hz to 60 hz, the replacement of the ship's generator and electrical switching gear replacement, new Vosper-Thornycroft machinery control systems, new and larger accommodations, and climate control systems for the cargo holds. The Navy awarded the contract in the amount of $150 million to Ocean Marine Navigation Company.

On 1 August 2002, Roy M. Wheat was moored at Norfolk Shipbuilding and Corporation Shipyard, Portsmouth. Sailors from the ship set up the Improved Navy Lighterage System (INLS) causeway ferries, off Liberia on 21 March 2008.

From 1 October 2012, Roy M. Wheat alongside ships of the Maritime Prepositioning Ship Squadron 1 would be transferred to the Military Sealift Command Surge Sealift due to the disestablishing of the squadron on 28 September.

Crowley Government Services Inc. was awarded $14,513,105 to maintain USNS Sgt. Matej Kocak (T-AK-3005), USNS PFC Eugene A. Obregon (T-AK-3006), USNS Maj. Stephen W. Pless (T-AK-3007) and LCPL Roy. M. Wheat on 29 September 2020.

== End of service ==
LCPL Roy M. Wheat left service and was stricken on 30 December 2021. As of January 31, 2022, the vessel was assigned to the James River Reserve Fleet at Ft. Eustis, Virginia, and was slated for disposal.

== Awards ==
- National Defense Service Medal

== Gallery ==
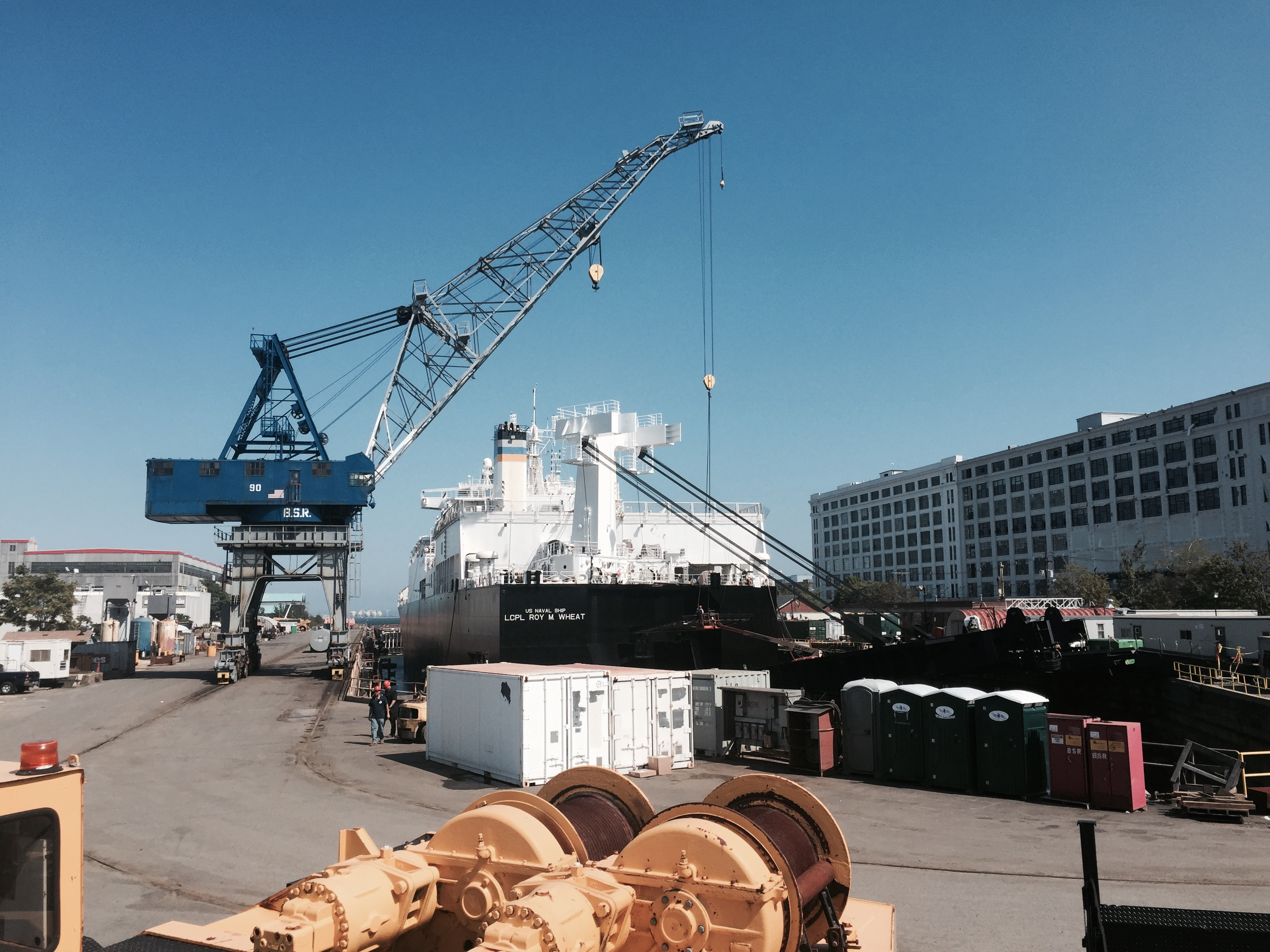
LCPL Roy M. Wheat in Drydock 3, Boston on 20 August 2015

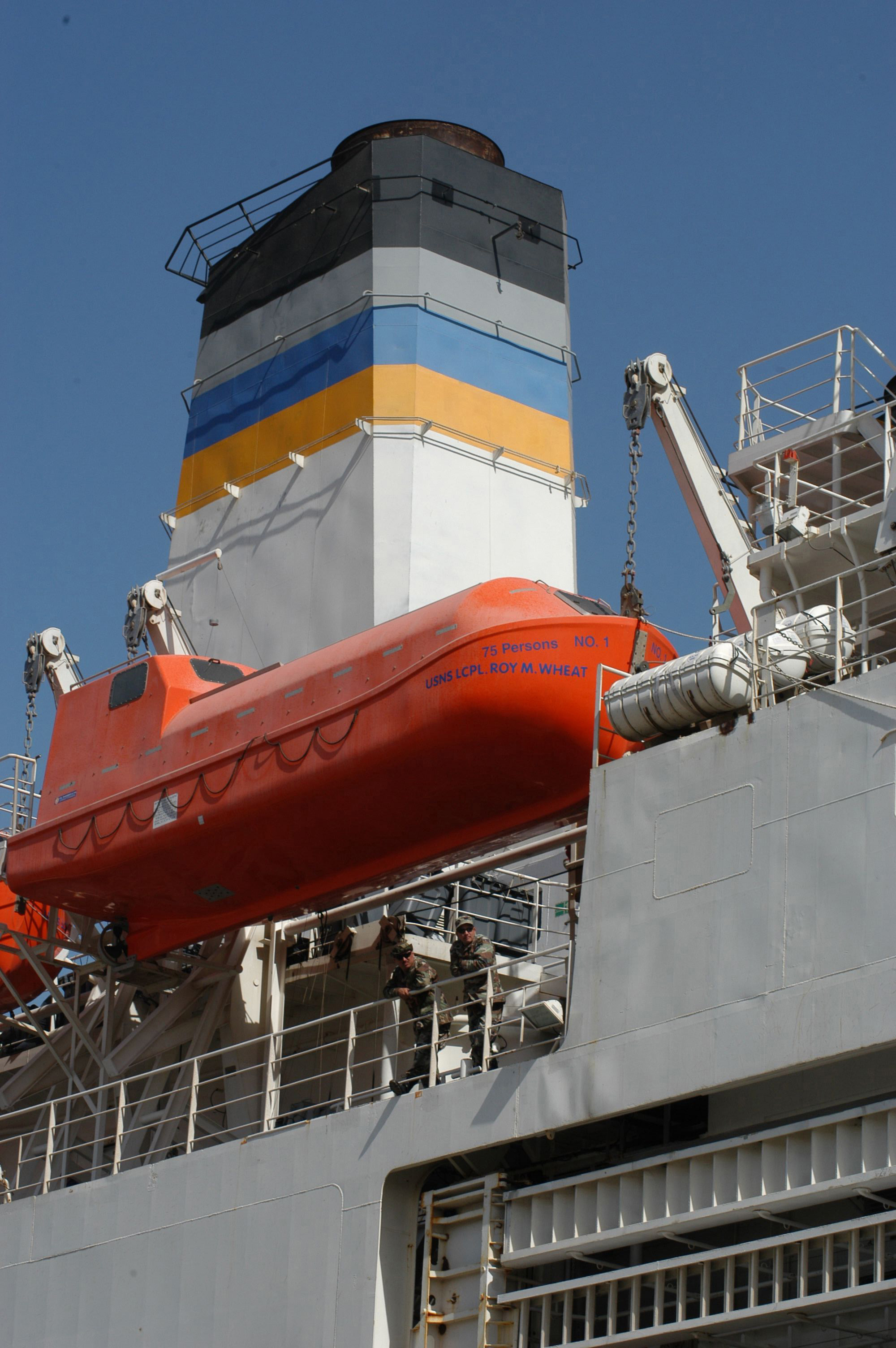
LCPL Roy M. Wheat's funnel with color bands

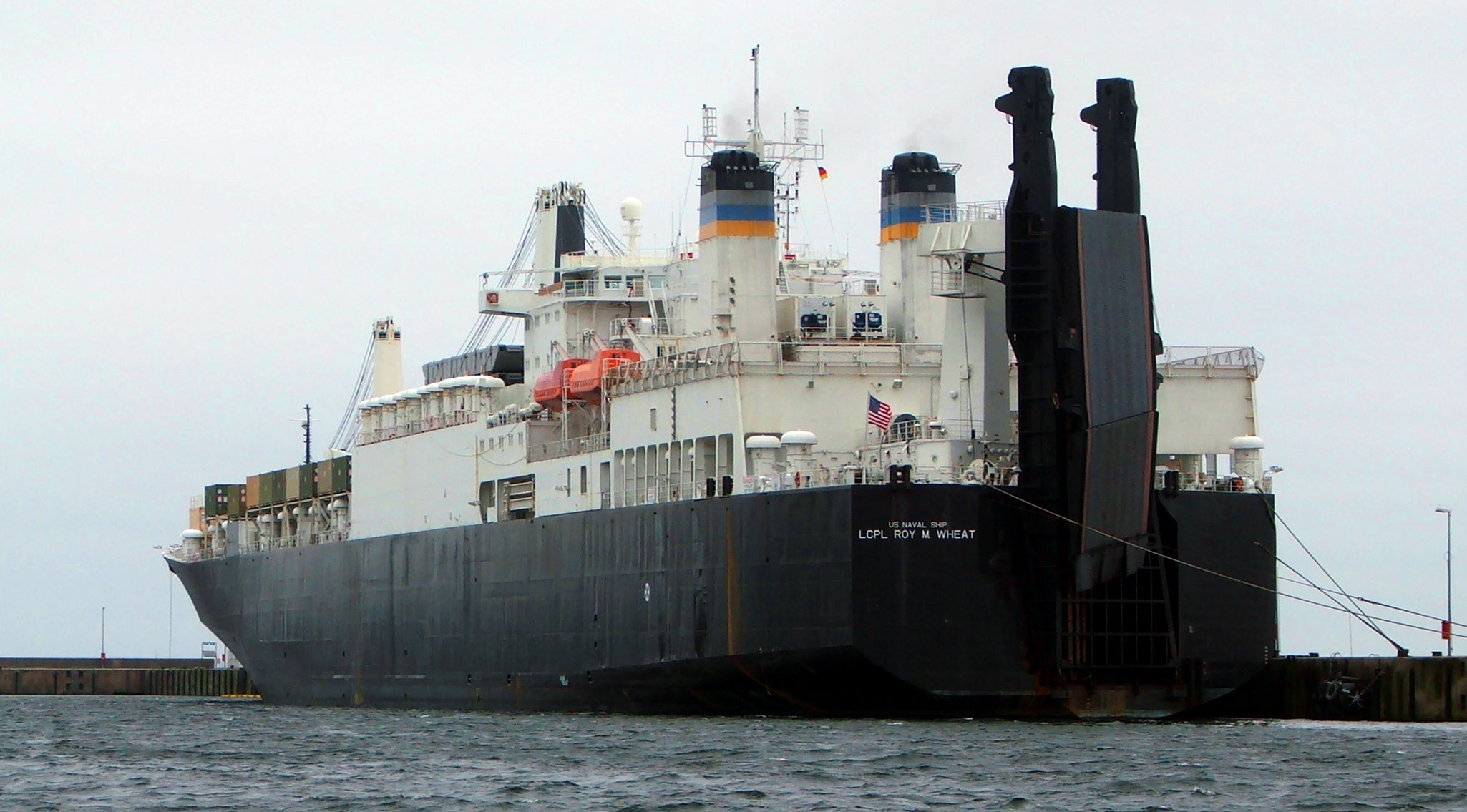
Aft view of LCPL Roy M. Wheat
