= Gbely =

- Municipality
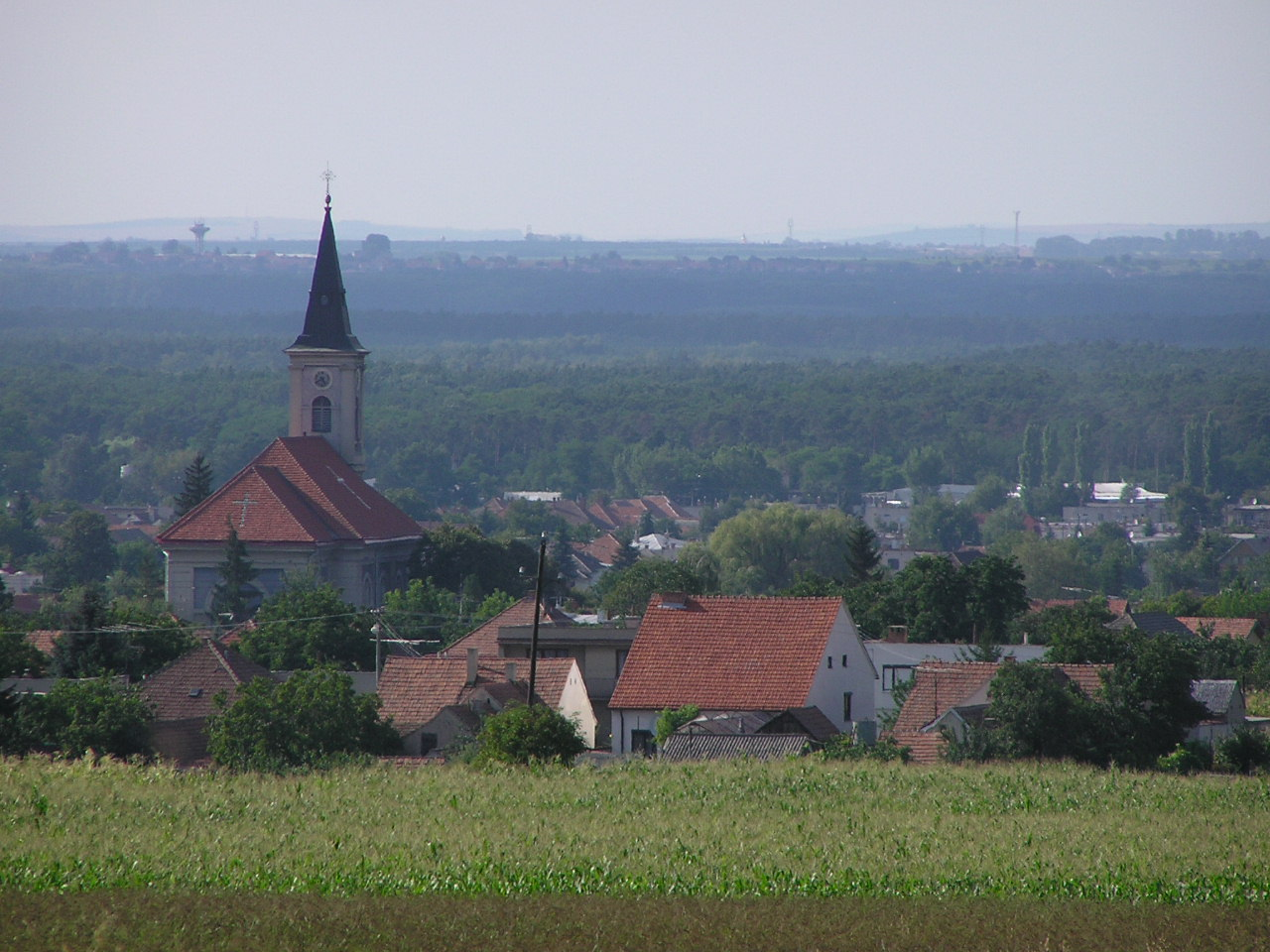

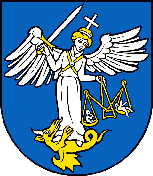
- Flag Coat of arms

- Location of Gbely in the Trnava Region Location of Gbely in Slovakia
- Coordinates: 48.72°N 17.12°E
- Country: Slovakia
- Region: Trnava Region
- District: Skalica District
- First mentioned: 1392

Government
  - Mayor: Jaroslav Hašek

Area
  - Total: 60.75 km^{2} (23.46 sq mi)
- Elevation: 172 m (564 ft)

Population (2025)
  - Total: 4,801
- Time zone: UTC+1 (CET)
  - Summer (DST): UTC+2 (CEST)
- Postal code: 908 45
- Area code: +421 34
- Vehicle registration plate (until 2022): SI
- Website: www.gbely.sk

Gbely (German and Hungarian: Egbell) is a town in the Skalica District, Trnava Region in western Slovakia, close to the Czech border.

== History ==
The first written record about Gbely was in 1392. It gained town rights in the 16th–17th centuries. Petroleum was discovered in 1912 and extraction started in 1914.

== Geography ==
The municipality lies at an altitude of 172 metres (564 ft) and covers an area of 60.75 km^{2} (23.46 sq mi) (2025).

It is located in the Záhorie region, in the Chvojnická pahorkatina hills, around 20 kilometres (12 mi) from the district seat Skalica and 75 kilometres (47 mi) from the Slovak capital Bratislava.

== Population ==
Population statistic (10 years)
Year	1995	2005	2015	2025
Count	5249	5149	5190	4801
Difference		−1.90%	+0.79%	−7.49%

Population statistic
Year	2024	2025
Count	4837	4801
Difference		−0.74%

It has a population of 4801 people (31 December 2025).

=== Ethnicity ===
Census 2021 (1+%)
Ethnicity	Number	Fraction
Slovak	4441	90.24%
Not found out	446	9.06%
Czech	76	1.54%
Romani	50	1.01%
Total	4921	

In year 2021 was 4921 people by ethnicity 4441 as Slovak, 446 as Not found out, 76 as Czech, 50 as Romani, 11 as Hungarian, 4 as Other, 2 as Rusyn, 2 as Russian, 1 as Jewish, 1 as Vietnamese, 1 as Italian, 1 as Austrian and 1 as English.

Note on population: The difference values of population numbers in the table "Population statistic" and in the sections "Ethnicity" & "Religion" is caused by the use of various statistical methods.

=== Religion ===
Census 2021 (1+%)
Religion	Number	Fraction
Roman Catholic Church	3033	61.63%
None	1313	26.68%
Not found out	435	8.84%
Total	4921	

In year 2021 was 4921 people by religion 3033 from Roman Catholic Church, 1313 from None, 435 from Not found out, 37 from Evangelical Church, 24 from Christian Congregations in Slovakia, 23 from Greek Catholic Church, 20 from Ad hoc movements, 9 from Other, 7 from Jehovah's Witnesses, 5 from Other and not ascertained christian church, 4 from Buddhism, 3 from Apostolic Church, 2 from Calvinist Church, 2 from Eastern Orthodox Church, 1 from Jewish community, 1 from Old Catholic Church, 1 from Paganism and natural spirituality and 1 from Seventh-day Adventist Church.

According to the 2001 census, the town had 5,223 inhabitants. 96.09% of inhabitants were Slovaks, 1.26% Czechs 0.96% Roma, and 1% Amit. The religious make-up was 83.40% Roman Catholics, 14.57% people with no religious affiliation and 0.69% Lutherans.

== Notable residents ==
- Matej Kocak (1882–1918) Slovak-American World War I Medal of Honor recipient was born here.

== Twin towns – sister cities ==
Gbely is twinned with:

- Židlochovice, Czech Republic
- Deutsch-Wagram, Austria

== See also ==
- List of municipalities and towns in Slovakia

== Genealogical resources ==
The records for genealogical research are available at the state archive "Statny Archiv in Bratislava, Slovakia"

- Roman Catholic church records (births/marriages/deaths): 1710-1904 (parish A)
- Lutheran church records (births/marriages/deaths): 1786-1895 (parish B)
