= SS Maj. Stephen W. Pless =

Sgt. Matej Kocak-class dry cargo ship

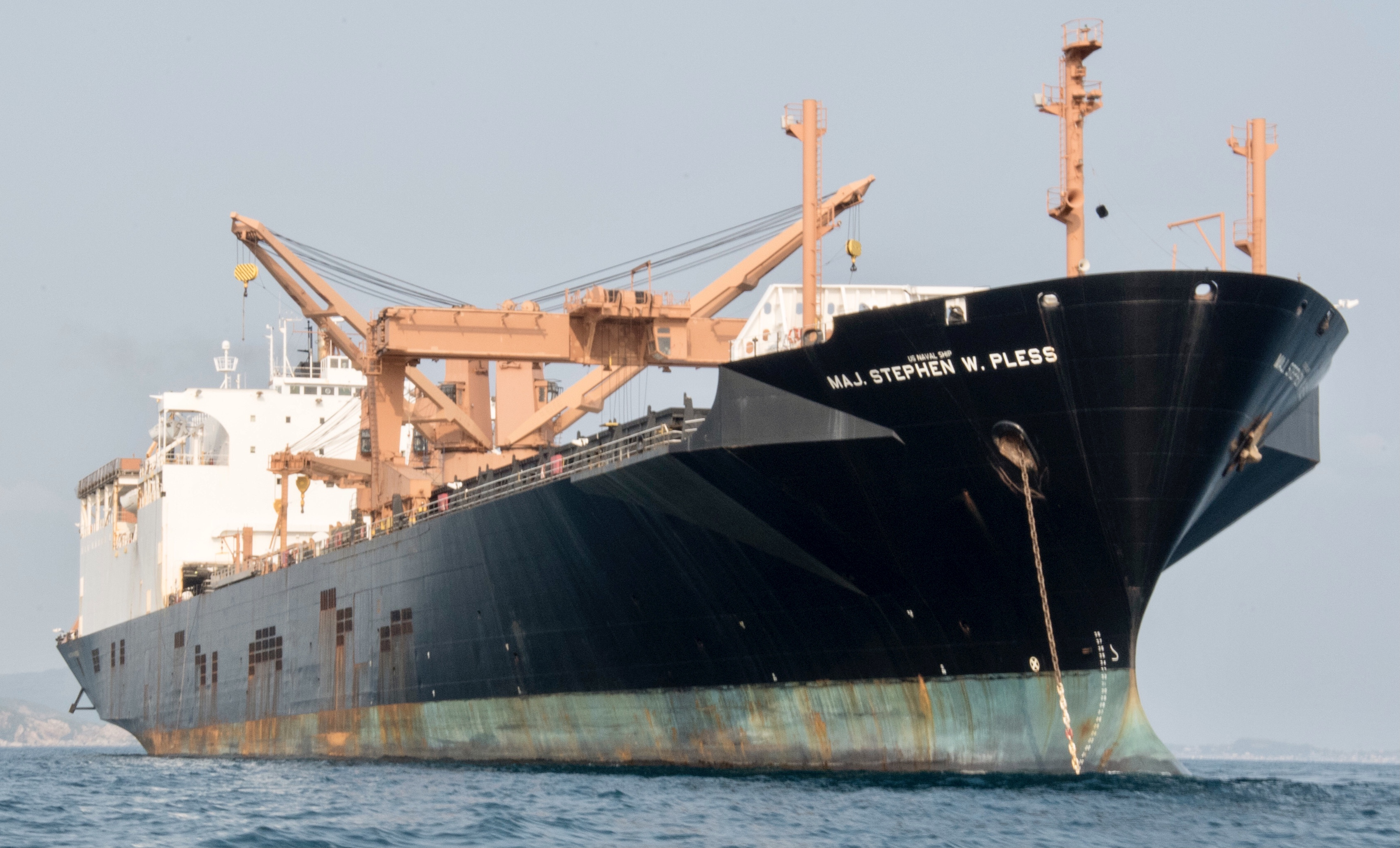
- USNS Maj. Stephen W. Pless

History

United States
- Name: Maj. Stephen W. Pless
- Namesake: Stephen W. Pless
- Owner: Waterman Steamship Corp. (1983–2010); Military Sealift Command (2010–present)
- Builder: Sun Shipbuilding
- Launched: 24 October 1982
- Completed: 1983
- Acquired: 1983
- Renamed: Charles Carroll (1983–1985)
- Reclassified: from AK-3007
- Stricken: 21 March 2023
- Identification: IMO number: 7912123; MMSI number: 366204000; Callsign: NSWP; Hull number: T-AK-3007
- Status: Stricken, awaiting scrapping

General characteristics
- Class & type: Sgt. Matej Kocak-class cargo ship
- Displacement: 26,125 t (25,712 long tons), light; 48,754 t (47,984 long tons), full
- Length: 821 ft 0 in (250.24 m)
- Beam: 105 ft 6 in (32.16 m)
- Draft: 33 ft 10 in (10.31 m)
- Installed power: 1 × shaft; 30,000 hp (22,000 kW)
- Propulsion: 2 × GE Marine turbine engines; 2 × boilers
- Speed: 20 knots (37 km/h; 23 mph)
- Capacity: 152,236 sq. ft. vehicle; 2,189 gallons petroleum; 2,189 gallons water; 532 TEU
- Complement: 34 mariners and 10 technicians
- Aviation facilities: Helipad

USNS Maj. Stephen W. Pless (T-AK-3007), (former SS Maj. Stephen W. Pless (AK-3007)), is the third ship of the Sgt. Matej Kocak-class cargo ship built in 1983. The ship is named after Major Stephen W. Pless, an American Marine who was awarded the Medal of Honor during the Vietnam War.

== Construction and commissioning ==
The ship was built in 1983 at the Sun Shipbuilding, Chester, Pennsylvania. She was put into the service of Waterman Steamship Corp. as Charles Carroll.

In 1985, she was acquired and chartered by the Navy under a long-term contract as SS Maj. Stephen W. Pless (AK-3007). The ship underwent conversion at the National Steel and Shipbuilding, San Diego.

On 13 December 1990, she unloaded cargos during Operation Desert Shield.

Maj. Stephen W. Pless was put into the Maritime Prepositioning Ship Squadron 3, based in the Indian Ocean. She was later transferred to the Military Sealift Command Surge Sealift as USNS Maj. Stephen W. Pless (T-AK-3007). A mariner fell from the ship which caused a US Navy search party to be sent on 11 February 2014. On 20 February 2016, Maj. Stephen W. Pless anchored off the Gulf of Thailand during Exercise Cobra Gold 2016.

Crowley Government Services Inc. was awarded $14,513,105 to maintain USNS LCPL Roy M. Wheat (T-AK-3016), USNS Sgt. Matej Kocak (T-AK-3005), USNS PFC Eugene A. Obregon (T-AK-3006) and Maj. Stephen W. Pless on 29 September 2020.

On 21 March 2023, Maj. Stephen W. Pless was stricken from the Naval Vessel Register. In 2025, it arrived in the port of Brownsville, Texas for scrapping.
