= SS PFC Eugene A. Obregon =

Sgt. Matej Kocak-class dry cargo ship

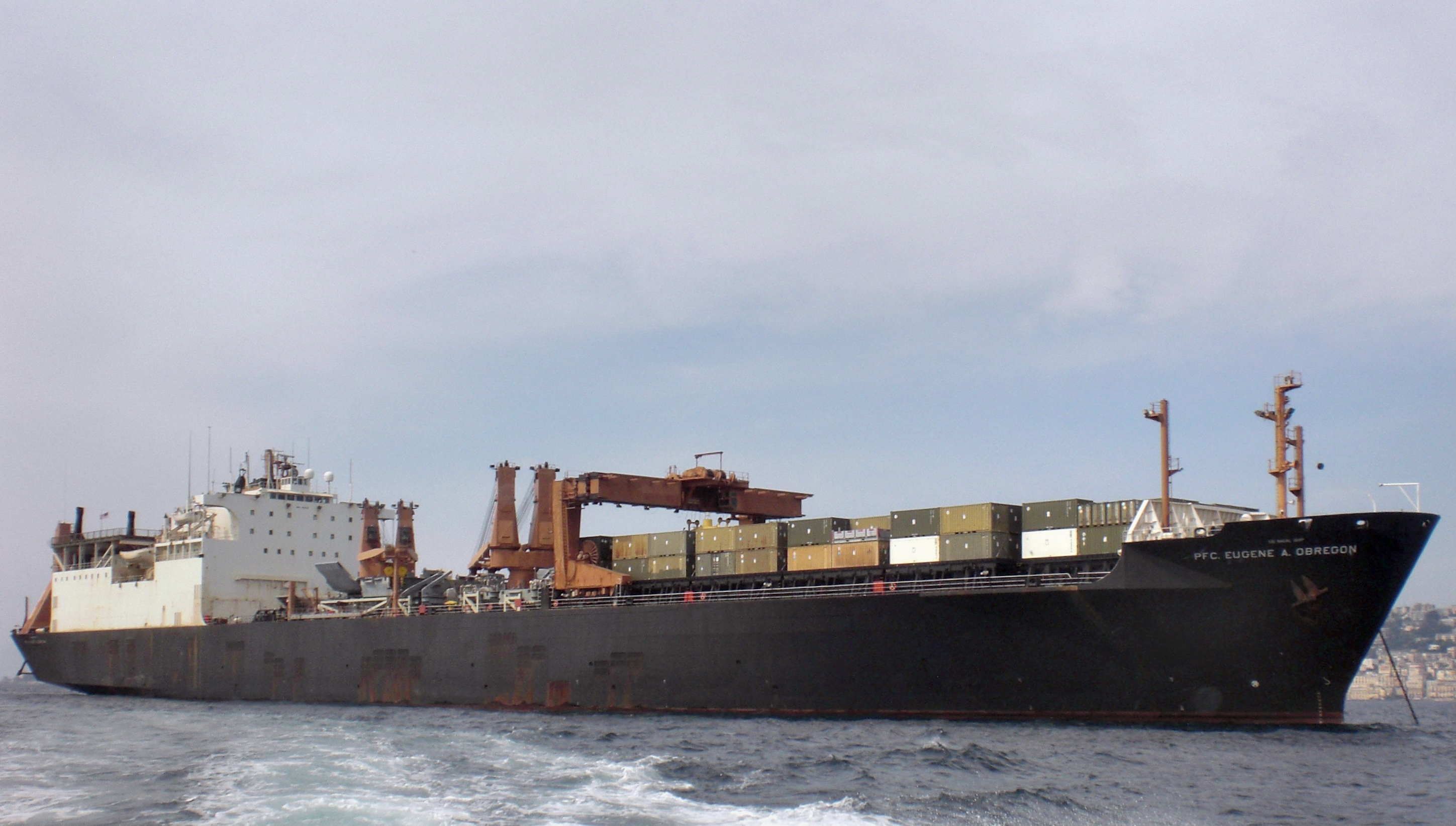
- USNS PFC Eugene A. Obregon

History

United States
- Name: PFC Eugene A. Obregon
- Namesake: Eugene A. Obregon
- Owner: Waterman Steamship Corp. (1983–2010); Military Sealift Command (2010–2023)
- Builder: Sun Shipbuilding
- Launched: 15 May 1982
- Completed: 1982
- Acquired: 11 February 1983
- Renamed: Thomas Heyward (1983–1985)
- Reclassified: from AK-3006
- Stricken: 21 March 2023
- Identification: IMO number: 7823463; MMSI number: 367240000; Callsign: NDWB; Hull number: T-AK-3006
- Status: Stricken

General characteristics
- Class & type: Sgt. Matej Kocak-class cargo ship
- Displacement: 26,125 t (25,712 long tons), light; 48,754 t (47,984 long tons), full
- Length: 821 ft 0 in (250.24 m)
- Beam: 105 ft 6 in (32.16 m)
- Draft: 33 ft 10 in (10.31 m)
- Installed power: 1 × shaft; 30,000 hp (22,000 kW)
- Propulsion: 2 × GE Marine turbine engines; 2 × boilers
- Speed: 20 knots (37 km/h; 23 mph)
- Capacity: 152,236 sq. ft. vehicle; 2,189 gallons petroleum; 2,189 gallons water; 532 TEU
- Complement: 34 mariners and 10 technicians
- Aviation facilities: Helipad

SS PFC Eugene A. Obregon (T-AK-3006), (former SS PFC Eugene A. Obregon (AK-3006) and USNS PFC Eugene A. Obregon (T-AK-3006)), is the second ship of the Sgt. Matej Kocak-class cargo ship built in 1982. The ship is named after Private First Class Eugene A. Obregon, an American Marine who was awarded the Medal of Honor during the Korean War.

== Construction and commissioning ==
The ship was built in 1982 at the Sun Shipbuilding, Chester, Pennsylvania. She was put into the service of Waterman Steamship Corp. as Thomas Heyward.

In 1985, she was acquired and chartered by the Navy under a long-term contract as SS PFC Eugene A. Obregon (AK-3006). The ship underwent conversion at the National Steel and Shipbuilding, San Diego.

In January 2010, PFC Eugene A. Obregon was put into the Maritime Prepositioning Ship Squadron 1, based in the Atlantic Ocean. On 14 September later that year, she arrived in the Bay of Naples.

She was later transferred to the Military Sealift Command Surge Sealift as USNS PFC Eugene A. Obregon (T-AK-3006) from 1 October 2012.

Crowley Government Services Inc. was awarded $14,513,105 to maintain USNS LCPL Roy M. Wheat (T-AK-3016), USNS Sgt. Matej Kocak (T-AK-3005), USNS Maj. Stephen W. Pless (T-AK-3007) and PFC Eugene A. Obregon on 29 September 2020.

On 21 March 2023, PFC Eugene A. Obregon, with the remaining two ships in the class, was stricken from the Naval Vessel Register.
