= SS Sgt. Matej Kocak =

Sgt. Matej Kocak-class dry cargo ship

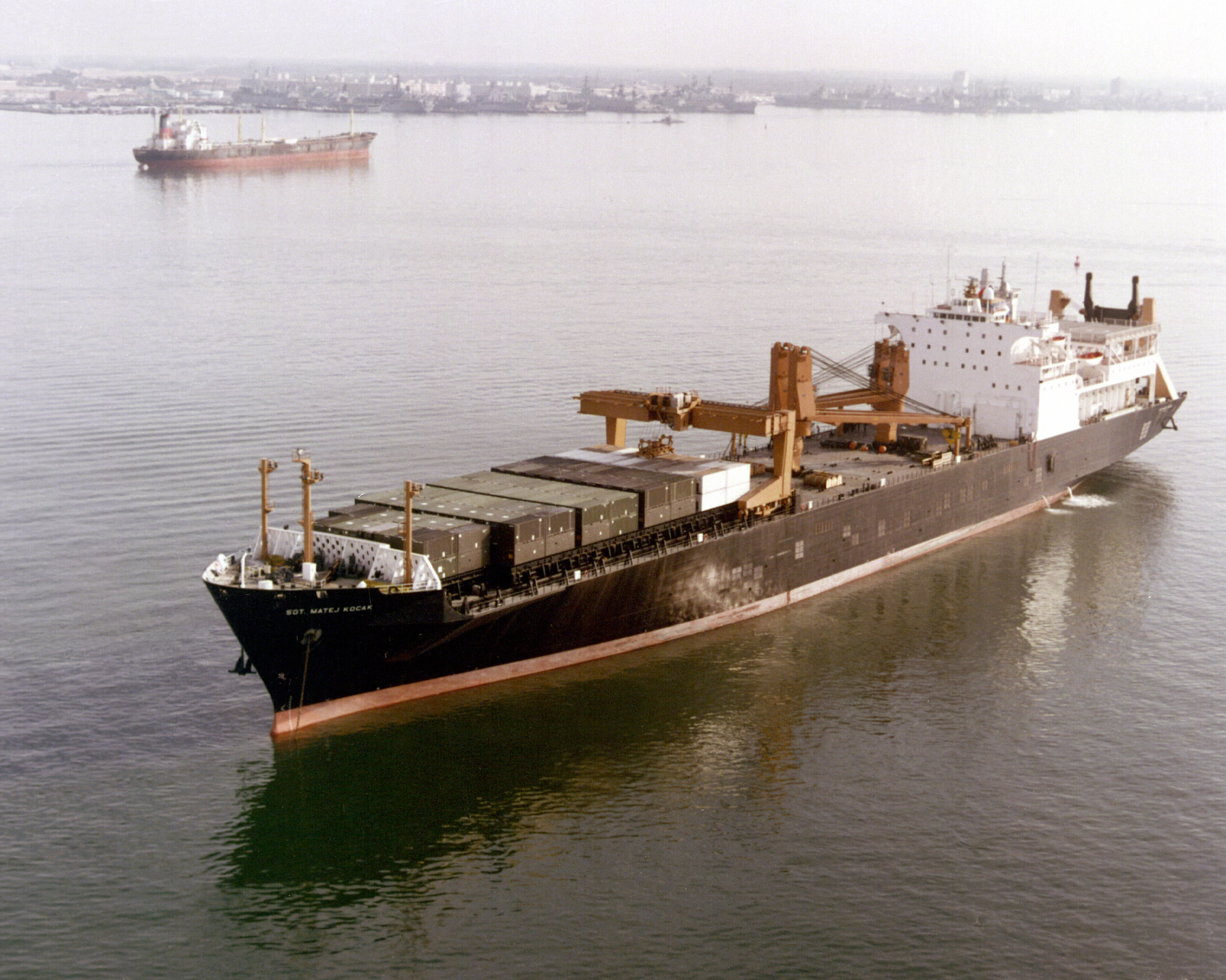
- SS Sgt. Matej Kocak

History

United States
- Name: Sgt. Matej Kocak
- Namesake: Matej Kocak
- Owner: Waterman Steamship Corp. (1983–); Military Sealift Command (–2023)
- Ordered: 21 November 1978
- Builder: Sun Shipbuilding
- Laid down: 3 March 1980
- Sponsored by: Mrs. George B. Moran
- Christened: 25 April 1981
- Acquired: 23 March 1983
- Renamed: John B. Waterman (1983–1984)
- Reclassified: from AK-3005
- Stricken: 21 March 2023
- Identification: IMO number: 7802706; MMSI number: 366203000; Callsign: NKCK; Hull number: T-AK-3005
- Status: Stricken

General characteristics
- Class & type: Sgt. Matej Kocak-class cargo ship
- Displacement: 26,125 t (25,712 long tons), light; 48,754 t (47,984 long tons), full
- Length: 821 ft 0 in (250.24 m)
- Beam: 105 ft 6 in (32.16 m)
- Draft: 33 ft 10 in (10.31 m)
- Installed power: 1 × shaft; 30,000 hp (22,000 kW)
- Propulsion: 2 × GE Marine turbine engines; 2 × boilers
- Speed: 20 knots (37 km/h; 23 mph)
- Capacity: 152,236 sq. ft. vehicle; 2,189 gallons petroleum; 2,189 gallons water; 532 TEU
- Complement: 34 mariners and 10 technicians
- Aviation facilities: Helipad

SS Sgt. Matej Kocak (T-AK-3005), (former SS Sgt. Matej Kocak (AK-3005) and USNS Sgt. Matej Kocak (T-AK-3005)), is the lead ship of the Sgt. Matej Kocak-class cargo ship built in 1981. The ship is named after Sergeant Matej Kocak, an American Marine who was awarded the Medal of Honor during World War I.

== Construction and commissioning ==
The ship was built in 1981 at the Sun Shipbuilding, Chester, Pennsylvania. She was put into the service of Waterman Steamship Corp. as John B. Waterman.

In 1984, she was acquired and chartered by the Navy under a long-term contract. The ship underwent conversion at the National Steel and Shipbuilding, San Diego until October 1984. Later that year, put into service as SS Sgt. Matej Kocak (AK-3005). Sgt. Matej Kocak was put into the Maritime Prepositioning Ship Squadron 2, based at Diego Garcia in the Indian Ocean to support the US Marine Corps Expeditionary Brigade.

She was later transferred to the Military Sealift Command Surge Sealift as USNS Sgt. Matej Kocak (T-AK-3005) from 2 October 2012. At 11:30 a.m. of 22 January 2015, she ran aground approximately six nautical miles off the coast of Uruma, Okinawa. She was refloated on 3 February later that year.

Crowley Government Services Inc. was awarded $14,513,105 to maintain USNS LCPL Roy M. Wheat, USNS PFC Eugene A. Obregon, USNS Maj. Stephen W. Pless and Sgt. Matej Kocak on 29 September 2020.

On 21 March 2023, Sgt. Matej Kocak was stricken from the Naval Vessel Register alone with another two ships in the class.
