= SS Cape Island =

Former civilian ship

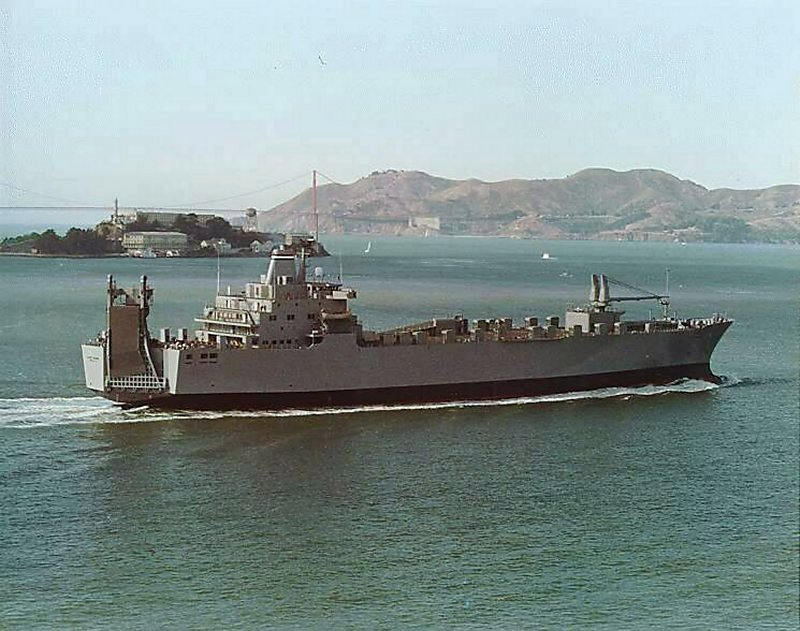
- Cape Island sailing into San Francisco Bay

History

United States
- Name: SS Illinois
- Owner: United States Maritime Administration
- Builder: Bath Iron Works, Bath, ME.
- Laid down: 16 February 1976
- Launched: 21 December 1976
- Acquired: 2 June 1977, to States Lines, and renamed the USNS Mercury,
- Renamed: SS Cape Island, 22 November 1993 and assigned to the Maritime Administration's Ready Reserve Force
- Identification: IMO number: 7390131; MMSI number: 366779000; Callsign: WZSZ
- Honors and awards: National Defense Service Medal - Southwest Asia Service Medal - Kuwait Liberation Medal (Kuwait)
- Status: laid up as part of the National Defense Reserve Fleet in a layberth at Tacoma, WA. in ROS-5 status
- Notes: May possibly be in ROE-10 not sure Currently Moored in Tacoma, Washington

General characteristics
- Class & type: Roll-on/Roll-off Ship
- Displacement: 15,000 tons, 33,900 tons full
- Length: 685 ft (209 m)
- Beam: 102 ft (31 m)
- Draft: 32 ft (9.8 m)
- Propulsion: two steam turbines, two propellers
- Speed: 23.0 Knots
- Range: 12,600
- Complement: Full Operational Status 31, Reduced Operational Status 9
- Armament: None

SS Cape Island (AKR-10) was originally laid down for commercial service in 1976 as Illinois, a Type C7 ship for the States Lines. It was eventually transferred to the Naval Vessel Register (NVR) as the USNS Mercury, as a transport ship for vehicles, and other goods. The ship was returned to Crowley Liner Services of Jacksonville, Florida. In 1993 the ship was permanently transferred to the navy's ready reserve force, and renamed Cape Island (T-AKR-10). The Cape Island remains laid up in a ready reserve state so that it may be activated in five days, if called upon. The ship is currently moored in Tacoma, Washington.

As of 9/12/23, SS Cape Island is undergoing sea trials in the Strait of Juan de Fuca.

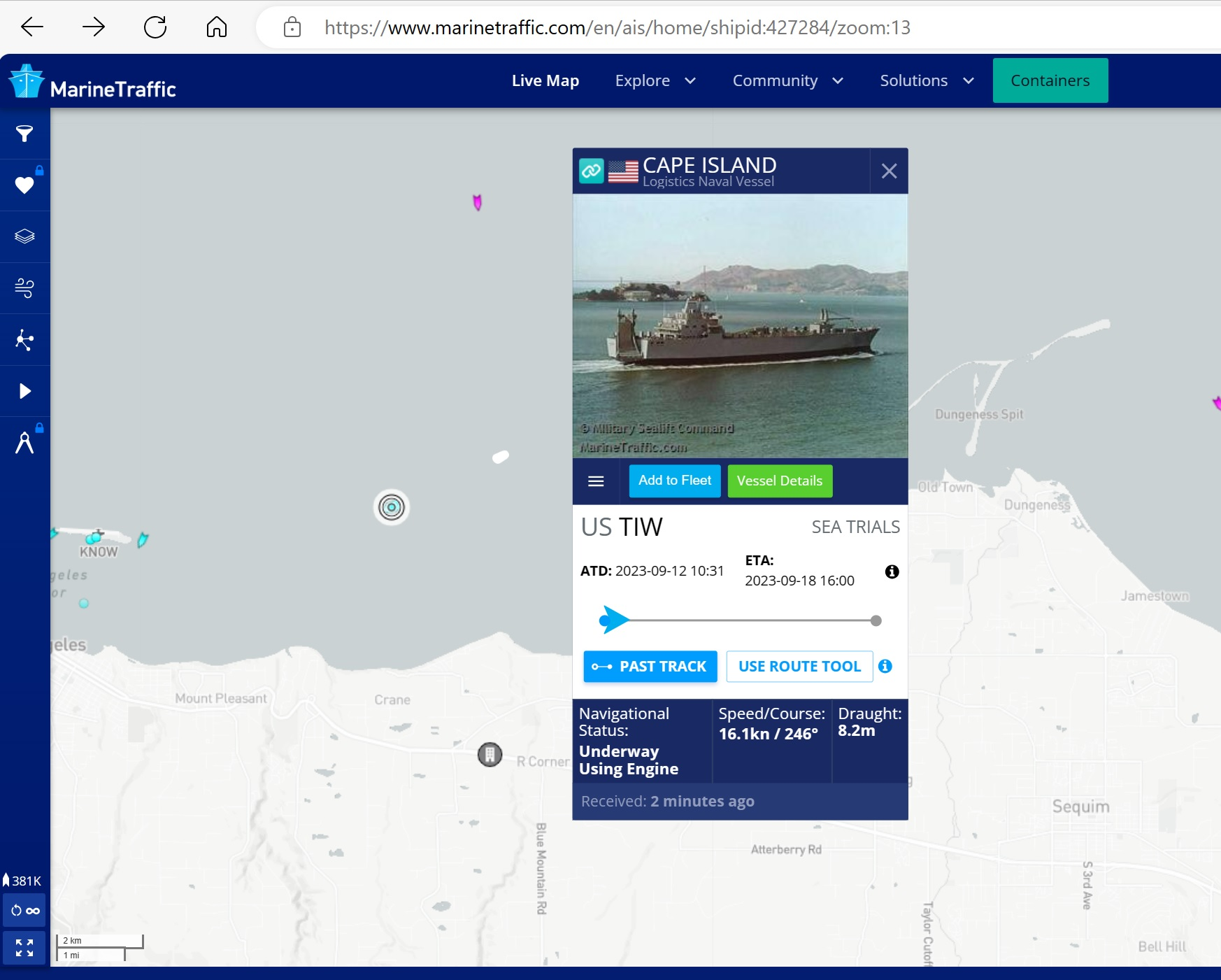
Sea trials on 2023-09-12
