= WYHL =

- Meridian, Mississippi; United States
- Frequency: 1450 kHz
- Branding: Fox Sports Meridian 99.7 FM 1450 AM

Programming
- Format: Sports
- Affiliations: Fox Sports Radio

Ownership
- Owner: Mississippi Broadcasters, LLC
- Sister stations: WJDQ; WZKS; WOKK; WJXM; WMOG

History
- First air date: 1947
- Last air date: December 2025
- Former call signs: WTOK (1946–1957); WOKK (1957–1973); WQIC (1973–1987); WMDN (1987–1990); WQIC (1990–1991); WMGP (1991–1996); WFFX (1996–2007)
- Call sign meaning: "Hallelujah" (previous format)

Technical information
- Licensing authority: FCC
- Facility ID: 7064
- Class: C
- Power: 1,000 watts (unlimited)
- Transmitter coordinates: 32°23′09″N 88°41′36″W
- Translator: 99.7 W259BP (Meridian)

Links
- Public license information: Public file; LMS

WYHL (1450 AM) was a sports radio station in Meridian, Mississippi, owned by Mississippi Broadcasters, LLC. The station operated from 1947 to 2025.

== History ==
The station was first licensed in 1947 as WTOK, owned by the Meridian Broadcasting Company. It changed its call sign to WOKK on April 1, 1957, after being sold to the New South Broadcasting Corporation by the Southern Television Corporation (which retained WTOK-TV); to WQIC on October 15, 1973, after a sale to Torgerson Broadcasting Company; to WMDN on April 13, 1987; back to WQIC on February 9, 1990; to WMGP on September 20, 1991; to WFFX on August 16, 1996; and to WYHL on March 23, 2007.

As of September 26, 2016, WYHL is now being heard on W259BP 99.7 FM in Meridian. (Info taken from Radio-Locator and fccdata.org)

As of January 17, 2017, WYHL changed format from gospel to sports, with programming from Fox Sports Radio. (info taken from stationintel.com)

WYHL closed down in December 2025 due to financial issues. The Federal Communications Commission cancelled the station's license on June 11, 2026.
