= Village Fair Mall =

Former shopping mall in Meridian, Mississippi

- Location: Meridian, Mississippi, United States
- Coordinates: 32°21′17.87″N 88°41′46.16″W
- Opened: March 2, 1972; 54 years ago
- Closed: 1997 (as Village Fair Mall); by 2009 (as Value Fair Mall)
- Demolished: 2020
- Developer: The Engel Company
- Owner: Lauderdale County
- Num. of stores: 50+
- Num. of anchor tenants: 2
- Floors: 1

Village Fair Mall (later known as Value Fair Mall) was a shopping mall in Meridian, Mississippi. Built in 1971, it opened on March 2, 1972, with anchor stores JCPenney and McRae's and over 50 retail spaces. Village Fair Mall closed in 1997 and was purchased by Lauderdale County in 2019. The mall was demolished in 2020 and redeveloped into the Lauderdale County Government Complex.

== History ==
Village Fair Mall was developed in 1971 by the Engel Company, who contracted A.K. McInnis, Jr., Incorporated to construct the mall on property on land owned by the Broadhead Trust. According to the Clarion-Ledger, the cost to develop the mall was over $6 million. It opened on March 2, 1972 with more than 50 retail spaces and anchor stores JCPenney and McRae's.

In 1978, F. R. Hoar & Son, Inc. was involved in the construction of a Morrison's Cafeteria at Village Fair Mall.

Chic Wigs operated a store at Village Fair Mall for more than 25 years before relocating to Bonita Lakes Mall.

Village Fair Mall was listed as the venue for the Mississippi Historical Radio and Broadcasting Society's Fall Show and Tell, scheduled for October 30–31, 1992. In the late 1990s, the property was also known as Value Fair Mall.

In the mid-1990s, Paul Broadhead, the owner of Village Fair Mall, was involved in litigation over leases connected with the proposed Bonita Lakes Mall development. In October 1997, the Mississippi Supreme Court affirmed the confirmation of those leases.

The mall closed in 1997.

Following the closure of Village Fair Mall in 1997, the property was rebranded and briefly operated as Value Fair Mall.

The property stayed vacant after the Value Fair mall closed. Demolition began in June 2020.

Asbestos abatement was carried out alongside the demolition, with the two projects costing approximately $1.7 million. By late July 2020, the asbestos removal had been completed and county crews were preparing to remove the remaining concrete slab.

In 2004, an Urban Land Institute advisory panel identified the vacant Village Fair Mall property as an important entrance to downtown Meridian and recommended that the city encourage redevelopment of the site.

In 2016, Lauderdale County considered using the former mall site for county government facilities, but the county did not proceed with the proposal at that time after groundwater contamination reports were presented to county supervisors.

In 2019, Lauderdale County purchased the approximately 39-acre former mall property for $1.25 million.

On October 16, 2019, Lauderdale County crews were demolishing the former Firestone building on the Village Fair Mall property.

The site later became the Lauderdale County Government Complex.

=== Lauderdale County Government Complex ===
In October 2020, the Lauderdale County Board of Supervisors approved a bond issue of up to $50 million for construction of a new courthouse at the former Village Fair Mall site. Construction of the Lauderdale County Government Center began in 2021. The new Lauderdale County Sheriff's Department opened at the complex on October 3, 2022. County offices began moving into the Government Center in October 2023. A grand opening and ribbon-cutting ceremony for the $50 million Government Center was held on November 6, 2023, when the facility was officially opened to the public.
