= WMOG (AM) =

- Meridian, Mississippi; United States
- Frequency: 910 kHz
- Branding: Praise 95.9 FM & 910 AM

Programming
- Format: Urban gospel

Ownership
- Owner: Clay Holladay; (Mississippi Broadcasters)
- Sister stations: WJXM; WZKS; WJDQ; WOKK

History
- First air date: February 4, 1927
- Former call signs: WCOC (1927–1973); WOKK (1973–1982); WALT (1982–2020)

Technical information
- Licensing authority: FCC
- Facility ID: 48640
- Class: B
- Power: 5,000 watts (day); 1,000 watts (night)
- Transmitter coordinates: 32°23′37″N 88°40′8″W
- Translator: (95.9 MHz) W240DY (Meridian)

Links
- Public license information: Public file; LMS
- Website: www.praisemeridian.com

WMOG (910 AM) is a radio station broadcasting an urban gospel format. Licensed to Meridian, Mississippi, United States, the station is owned by Clay Holladay, through licensee Mississippi Broadcasters.

== History ==
The station first went on the air as WCOC in 1927 from Columbus, Mississippi, and was owned by the Crystal Oil Company. It was moved to Meridian in 1929.

As WOKK, the station had a country format until 1983 when it swapped with WALT FM 97.1 MHz. WALT carried a Hot AC format until 1985, when the format changed to Urban Contemporary and its moniker became T-91 and it broadcast in AM Stereo.

WALT changed to a talk radio format on August 20, 2010, when it began simulcasting on WALT-FM 102.1 MHz. In 2019, WALT broke off simulcasting Talk with WALT-FM and flipped to Urban Gospel as Praise 910 AM.

The station changed its call sign to WMOG on March 16, 2020.
