= WJXM (FM) =

Urban contemporary radio station in Marion–Meridian, Mississippi

Coordinates: 32.325°N 88.688°W

- Marion, Mississippi; United States
- Broadcast area: Meridian, Mississippi
- Frequency: 95.1 MHz
- Branding: 95.1 The Beat

Programming
- Format: Mainstream urban
- Affiliations: Compass Media Networks

Ownership
- Owner: Clay Holladay; (Mississippi Broadcasters)
- Sister stations: WZKS; WOKK; WJDQ; WMOG

History
- First air date: 1987
- Former call signs: WQIC (1987–1990); WZMP (1990–1996); WZRW (1996–1997); WYYW (1997–2006); WJDQ (2006–2011); WKZB (2011–2016)

Technical information
- Licensing authority: FCC
- Facility ID: 7065
- Class: C2
- ERP: 26,000 watts
- HAAT: 182 meters (597 ft)

Links
- Public license information: Public file; LMS
- Webcast: Listen live
- Website: www.thebeat951.com

WJXM (95.1 MHz, "95.1 The Beat") is an urban contemporary music formatted FM radio station broadcasting in the Meridian, Mississippi, Arbitron market. In one form or another, WKZB had been a top 40 station in the market for over twenty years. While the station currently broadcasts on 95.1, it was originally located on the 101.3 frequency and carried a "Q101" branding. WKZB's original city of license was Meridian, but with the move to 95.1, it was relicensed to Marion, Mississippi. URBan Radio Broadcasting purchased the radio station from Clear Channel in 2007 and then sold it, along with its sister stations, to New South Communications in September 2011.

== History ==
In 2008, WJDQ changed formats from Top 40 to a new "mix" format, which blended both the Hot AC and Adult album alternative formats. Prior to its flip to its current urban contemporary format, the station was a Modern AC format. It also slightly altered its moniker, becoming "95Q" rather than the previous incarnation as "Q951" and debuted a new logo to go along with the new format.

On September 9, 2011 WJDQ changed their format to classic hits, branded as "95.1 The Buzz". On September 26, 2011, the call letters changed to WKZB to match the new format and branding.

On October 28, 2016, WKZB changed their format from classic hits (which moved to WUCL, licensed to the 97.9 FM frequency in Newton, MS) to urban, branded as "95.1 The Beat"; the format moved from WJXM 105.7 FM DeKalb as part of a three-station format shuffle. WKZB's classic hits format moved to WUCL 97.9 FM Newton, MS. The format changes coincided with a two-part sale of the station, where New South Communications sold WKZB and three other stations to Burke Broadcasting, LLC, who then flipped two stations (including WKZB) to Mississippi Broadcasters. On November 16, 2016, WKZB changed their call letters to WJXM.
