= WJDQ =

Radio station in Meridian, Mississippi

Coordinates: 32.320°N 88.691°W

- Meridian, Mississippi; United States
- Broadcast area: Meridian, Mississippi
- Frequency: 101.3 MHz
- Branding: Q101

Programming
- Format: Top 40 (CHR)
- Affiliations: Premiere Networks; United Stations Radio Networks; Westwood One

Ownership
- Owner: Mississippi Broadcasters LLC
- Sister stations: WZKS; WOKK; WJXM; WMOG

History
- First air date: February 1968
- Former call signs: WDAL-FM (1968–1976); WDAL (1976–1979); WJDQ (1979–2006); WYHL (2006); WMSO (2006–2011)

Technical information
- Licensing authority: FCC
- Facility ID: 7067
- Class: C1
- ERP: 100,000 watts
- HAAT: 176 meters (577 ft)

Links
- Public license information: Public file; LMS
- Webcast: Listen live
- Website: www.q101radio.net

WJDQ (101.3 FM, "Q101") is a Top 40 (CHR) formatted radio station in Meridian, Mississippi.

== History ==
Broadcasters and Publishers, Inc., received the construction permit for a new FM radio station in Meridian. When WDAL-FM hit the air in February 1968, it was the 24-hour counterpart to 1330 WDAL, simulcasting its country format during the day and airing contemporary music at night. The -FM suffix was dropped in 1976, and the station became WJDQ for the first time in 1979 and flipped to a Top 40/CHR station as "Q101". The station remained as a CHR format throughout the next three-and-a-half decades.

In 2006, WJDQ dropped its CHR format and became WMSO as "Miss 101" with a country format. On September 9, 2011, WMSO dropped its country format, flipped back to CHR, and returned to its "Q101" branding. On October 7, 2011, WMSO changed their call letters back to WJDQ, which had previously been on the 95.1 frequency (now WJXM) in the intervening five years.
