= Uptown Meridian =

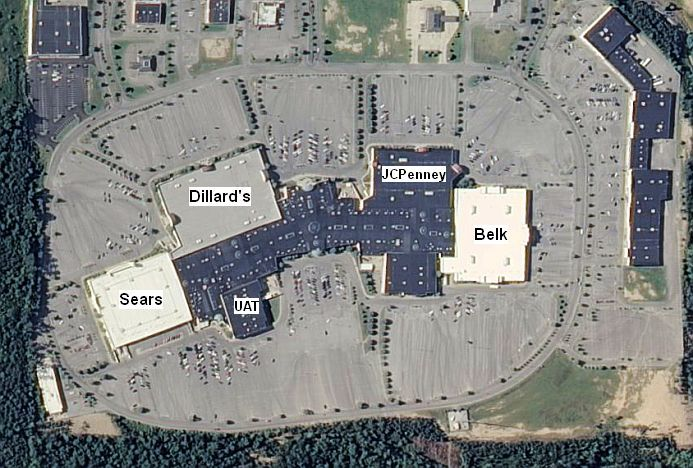
- Aerial view of Uptown Meridian and anchor tenants as of 2014
- Location: Meridian, Mississippi, United States
- Coordinates: 32.3586°N 88.6719°W
- Address: 1210 Bonita Lakes Circle
- Opened: 1997
- Developer: CBL & Associates Properties
- Owner: RockStep Capital
- Num. of stores: 80
- Num. of anchor tenants: 6
- Floor area: 632,192 sq ft (58,732.6 m^{2})
- Floors: 1
- Website: uptownmeridian.com

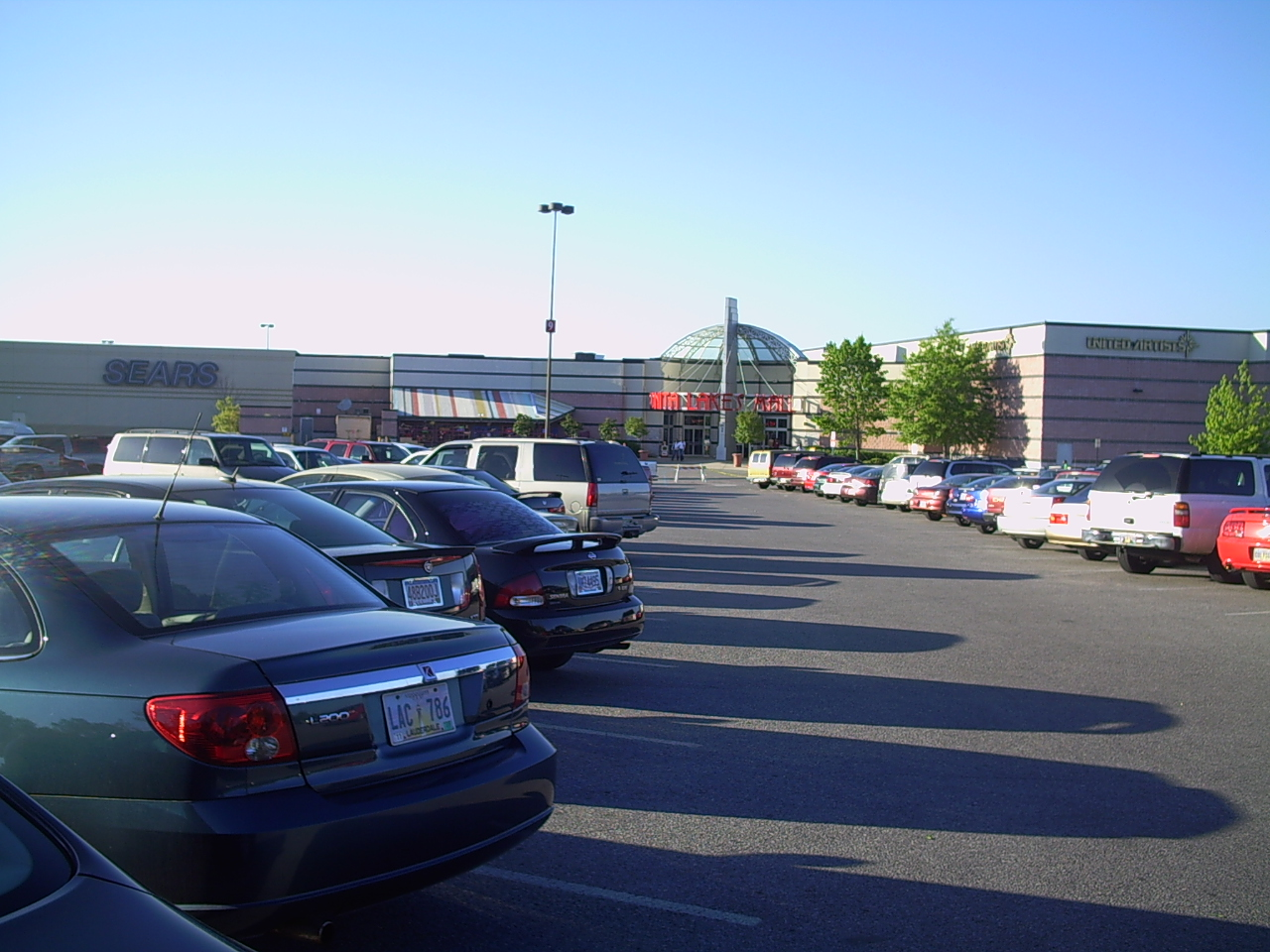
Food court/cinema entrance to Uptown Meridian

Uptown Meridian (formerly Bonita Lakes Mall) is an enclosed shopping mall located in Meridian, Mississippi, United States.

== History ==
The mall opened on October 15, 1997, and was owned by CBL & Associates Properties. In 2016, Bonita Lakes Mall was sold to RockStep Capital. Over one hundred shopping venues are located within or outside the mall. Venues include department stores, specialty shops, restaurants, eateries, and a movie theater. Bonita Lakes Mall was renamed Uptown Meridian in 2020.

== Anchor tenants ==
- Belk (formerly McRae's)
- Dillard's
- Fitness Depot
- Golden Ticket Cinemas
- Woodstock Furniture Clearance Outlet

== Former tenants ==
- Goody's
- JCPenney (closed in 2017)
- Sears (closed in 2018)
- United Artists Theatres
- AllIn1 Adventures (formerly Hype Indoor Adventures)

== Bonita Lakes Crossing ==
Bonita Lakes Crossing is a shopping center located outside of the mall. Some of the stores in the center include Ashley Furniture HomeStore, Cato Fashions, and Jo-Ann.
