= WZKS =

Coordinates: 32.4976°N 88.8873°W

- Union, Mississippi; United States
- Broadcast area: Meridian, Mississippi
- Frequency: 104.1 MHz
- Branding: Kiss 104.1

Programming
- Format: Urban adult contemporary
- Affiliations: United Stations Radio Networks

Ownership
- Owner: Mississippi Broadcasters, LLC
- Sister stations: WJDQ; WOKK; WJXM; WMOG

Technical information
- Licensing authority: FCC
- Facility ID: 17357
- Class: C2
- ERP: 19,000 watts
- HAAT: 163 meters (535 ft)

Links
- Public license information: Public file; LMS
- Website: www.104kissfm.com

WZKS (104.1 FM) is a radio station broadcasting in the Arbitron market in Meridian, Mississippi, United States.
