= WOKK =

- Meridian, Mississippi; United States
- Frequency: 97.1 MHz
- Branding: 97 OKK

Programming
- Format: Country

Ownership
- Owner: Mississippi Broadcasters, LLC
- Sister stations: WUCL; WJDQ; WZKS; WMOG

History
- First air date: 1970
- Former call signs: WALT (1970–1982)

Technical information
- Licensing authority: FCC
- Facility ID: 48635
- Class: C1
- ERP: 100,000 watts
- HAAT: 183 meters (600 ft)
- Transmitter coordinates: 32°19′30″N 88°41′17″W

Links
- Public license information: Public file; LMS
- Webcast: Listen live
- Website: www.wokk.com

WOKK (97.1 FM, "97 OKK") is a country music-formatted radio station broadcasting in the Meridian, Mississippi, Arbitron market. Owned by Mississippi Broadcasters, Inc., its transmitter is located on Mississippi Highway 145 south of Meridian. From 1970 to 1983, the callsign was WALT and until 1981 was formatted as a top-40 station. The growth of competitor WJDQ "Q-101" prompted WALT to adopt an easy-listening format, much to the chagrin of its listeners. But the format change was short-lived. In 1983 the station swapped with WOKK (AM 910) and adopted the WOKK country format. Since the swap, WOKK 97.1 has been one of the most listened-to stations in the area.

WOKK is part of the Alert FM digital-alert and messaging system for Lauderdale County first responders.
