= History of Meridian, Mississippi =

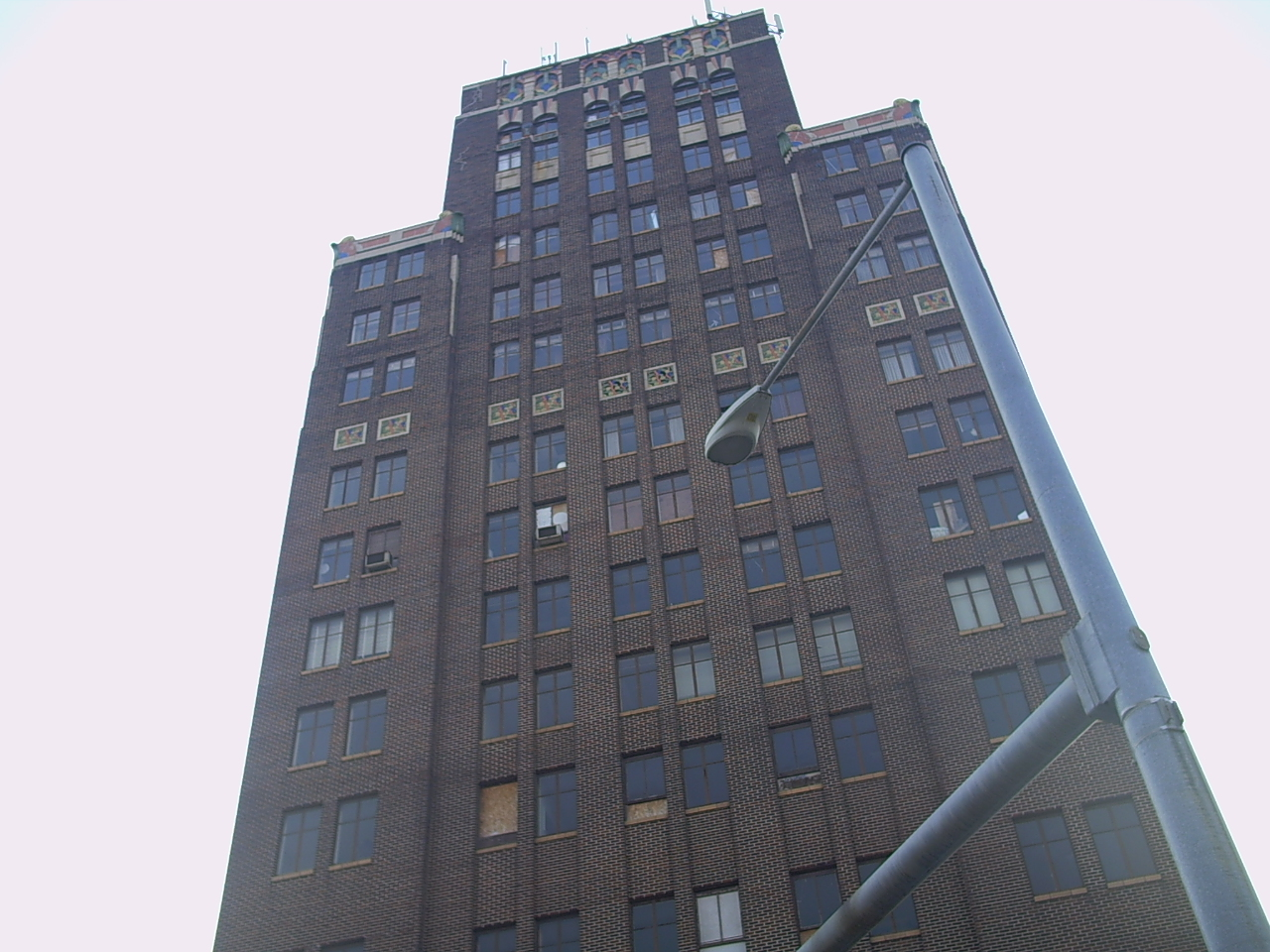
Meridian's most visible icon, the Threefoot Building, was built in 1929.

The history of Meridian, Mississippi begins in the early 19th century before European-American settlement. Originally settled by the Choctaw Indians, the land was bought by the United States according to the Treaty of Dancing Rabbit Creek in 1830. The city grew around the intersection of the Mobile and Ohio Railroad and the Southern Railway of Mississippi and developed a largely rail-based economy. Although much of the city was burned down in the Battle of Meridian during the American Civil War, the city was rebuilt and entered a "Golden Age." Between about 1890 and 1930, the city was the largest in Mississippi and a leading center for manufacturing in the Southern United States. After the decline of the railroading industry in the 1950s, the city's economy was devastated, resulting in a slow population decline. The population has continued to decline as the city has struggled to create a new, more modern economy based on newer industries. In the past 20 years or so, Meridian has attempted to revitalize the city's economy by attracting more business and industry to the city, most specifically the downtown area.

== Establishment ==
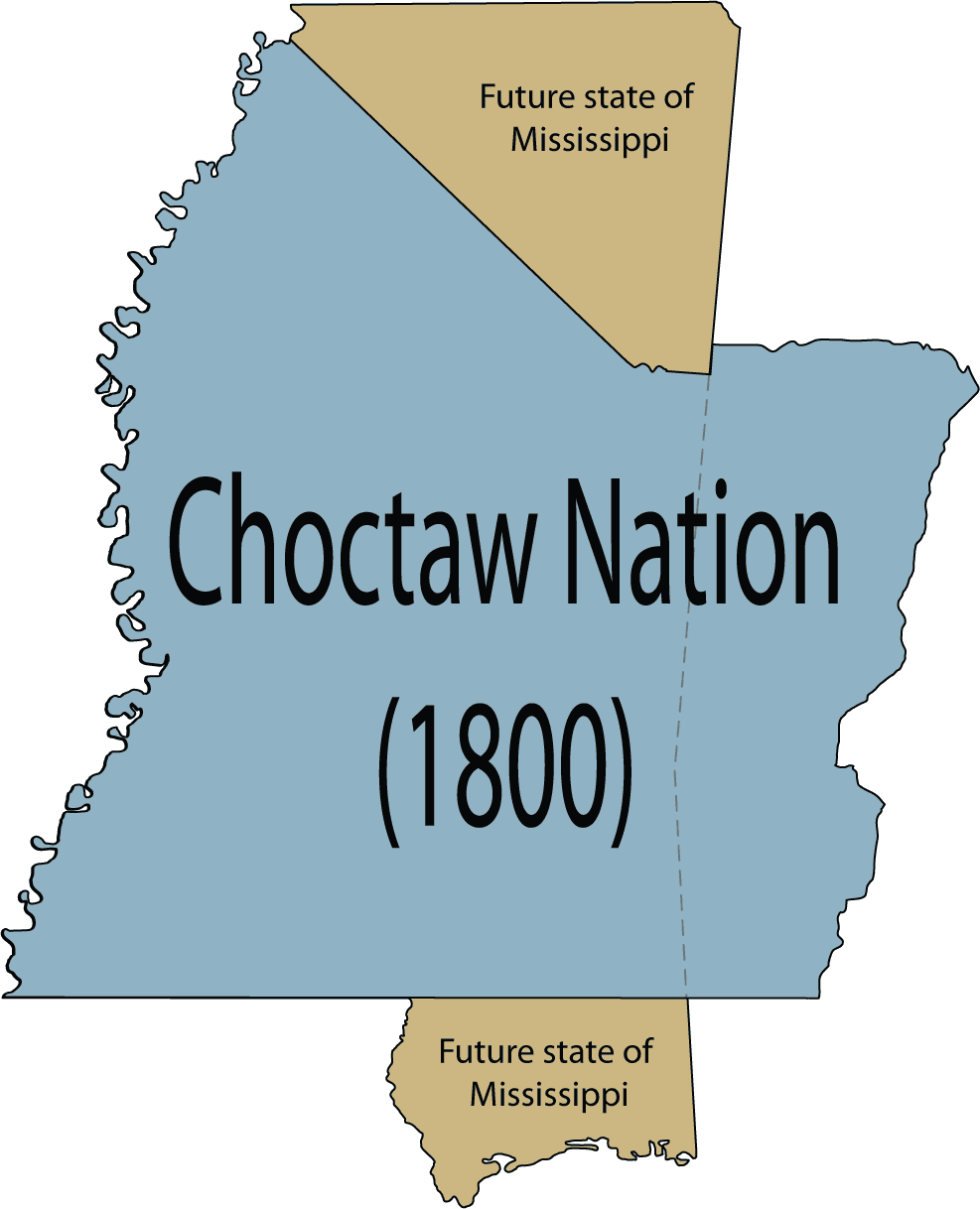
The area which is now Meridian was previously part of the Choctaw Nation.

Under pressure from the US government, the Choctaw Native Americans agreed to removal from all lands east of the Mississippi River under the terms of the Treaty of Dancing Rabbit Creek in 1830. Although many Choctaws moved to present-day Oklahoma, a significant number chose to stay in their homeland, citing Article XIV of the treaty. Today, most Choctaws, who are part of the Mississippi Band of Choctaw Indians, live on several Indian Reservations located throughout the state. The largest reservation is located in Choctaw, MS, 35 miles (56 km) northwest of the city.

After the treaty was ratified, European-American settlers rapidly began to officially move into the region. In 1831, only a year after the treaty was signed, a Virginian named Richard McLemore became the first settler of Meridian after receiving a federal land grant of about 2,000 acres (810 ha). McLemore owned most of the land in the area, and his plantation home was the only notable residence in the vicinity at the time. To attract more settlers to the region and develop the area, McLemore began offering free land to newcomers. In 1833, Benjamin Graham also received a land grant of 82 acres (33 ha) in the area now known as Valley Road. Another pioneer named James Trussell bought some land from W. C. Trussell, who had originally purchased the land while it was still part of the Mississippi Territory. By 1833, enough people had migrated to the area to warrant the creation of a county government; thus, Lauderdale County was established.

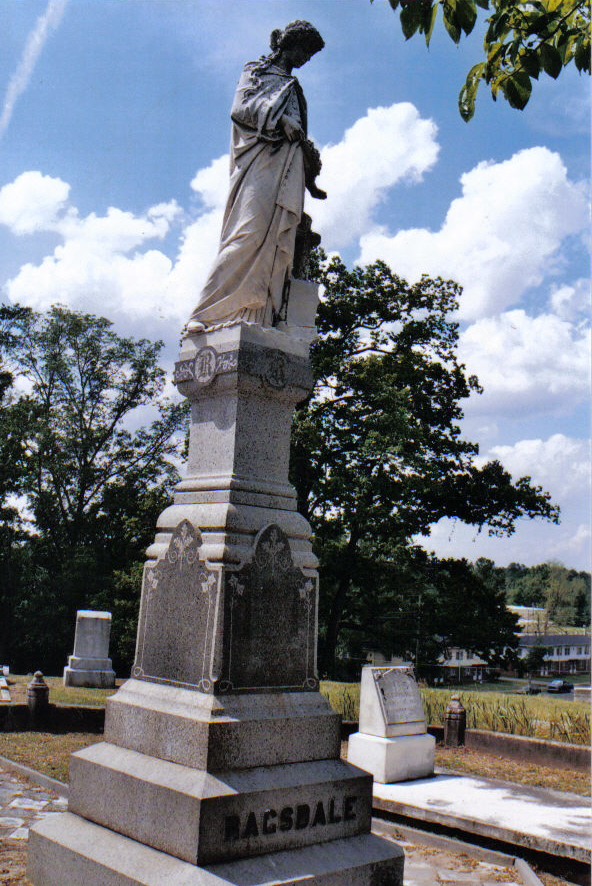
A monument in Rose Hill Cemetery honoring Lewis A. Ragsdale, one of the founders of Meridian.

In 1853, around the time that construction of the Mobile and Ohio Railroad began in the area, most of Richard McLemore's land was bought by Lewis A. Ragsdale, a lawyer from Alabama, and John T. Ball, a merchant from Kemper County. Both men sought to make a profit from the planned crossing of the Mobile and Ohio with the Vicksburg and Montgomery Railroad, but Ragsdale beat Ball to the area by a few days. Ragsdale's bought the McLemore Farm, which was east of present-day 27th Avenue and included much of what would become the central business district. Ball purchased only 80 acres (32 ha) west of 27th Avenue. McLemore and his family moved north out of the city, and Ragsdale moved into McLemore's log home, turning it into a tavern.

Ragsdale and Ball, now known as the founders of the city, began to compete with each other by laying out lots for new development on their respective land sections. The competition intensified over the desired name for the settlement. Ball believed the word "meridian" was synonymous to "junction," so he, along with the industrial citizens of the city, preferred that name, but the agrarian population of the city preferred "Sowashee," which means "mad river" in a Native American language and is the name of a nearby creek. Also, Ragsdale wanted to name the new settlement Ragsdale City after himself. Ball soon erected a small wooden station house and coerced the owners of the Mobile and Ohio Railroad to grant depot privileges to the site. The owners agreed, provided the station was constructed according to their specifications and was furnished at the community's expense. For nearly two years, though, the site was treated as a mere flag station and denied ordinary station accommodations while the expense of station maintenance fell on Ball himself.

The competition continued between Ragsdale and Ball. Each day the sign on the station house would be changed, alternating between Meridian and Sowashee. Instead of compromising, the two founders began to lay out city streets with differing plans. One day one of them would drive stakes in line with his plan, and the next day, the other would pull up his rival's stakes and drive some of his own. Ball laid his streets parallel to the railroad, and Ragsdale chose to use true compass headings. The competition is still evident today in the angles at which some streets meet in the city. The intersecting area has been described as "having been formed by some giant who playfully gathered up a handful of triangles and dropped them at the junction of two railroads."

Eventually the continued development of the railroads led to an influx of railroad workers who overruled the others in the city and left "Meridian" on the station permanently, and the town was officially incorporated as Meridian on February 10, 1860. Meanwhile, the Vicksburg and Montgomery Railroad (which would later become part of the Southern Railway of Mississippi) continued to progress eastward out of Jackson, Mississippi. It appeared that Ball and Ragsdale had incorrectly anticipated the location of the railroad junction. The railroad was planning to cross the Mobile and Ohio Railroad at Enterprise, Mississippi, but railroad administration could not obtain cooperation from Enterprise officials. Businessmen in Meridian were more than eager for this economic opportunity and convinced Southern to cross there instead. After persuasion from Ball and other citizens of the city, William Crosby Smedes, the president of the Southern Railway agreed with the owners of the Mobile and Ohio on keeping the name Meridian, as which the city has been known ever since.

== Civil War ==
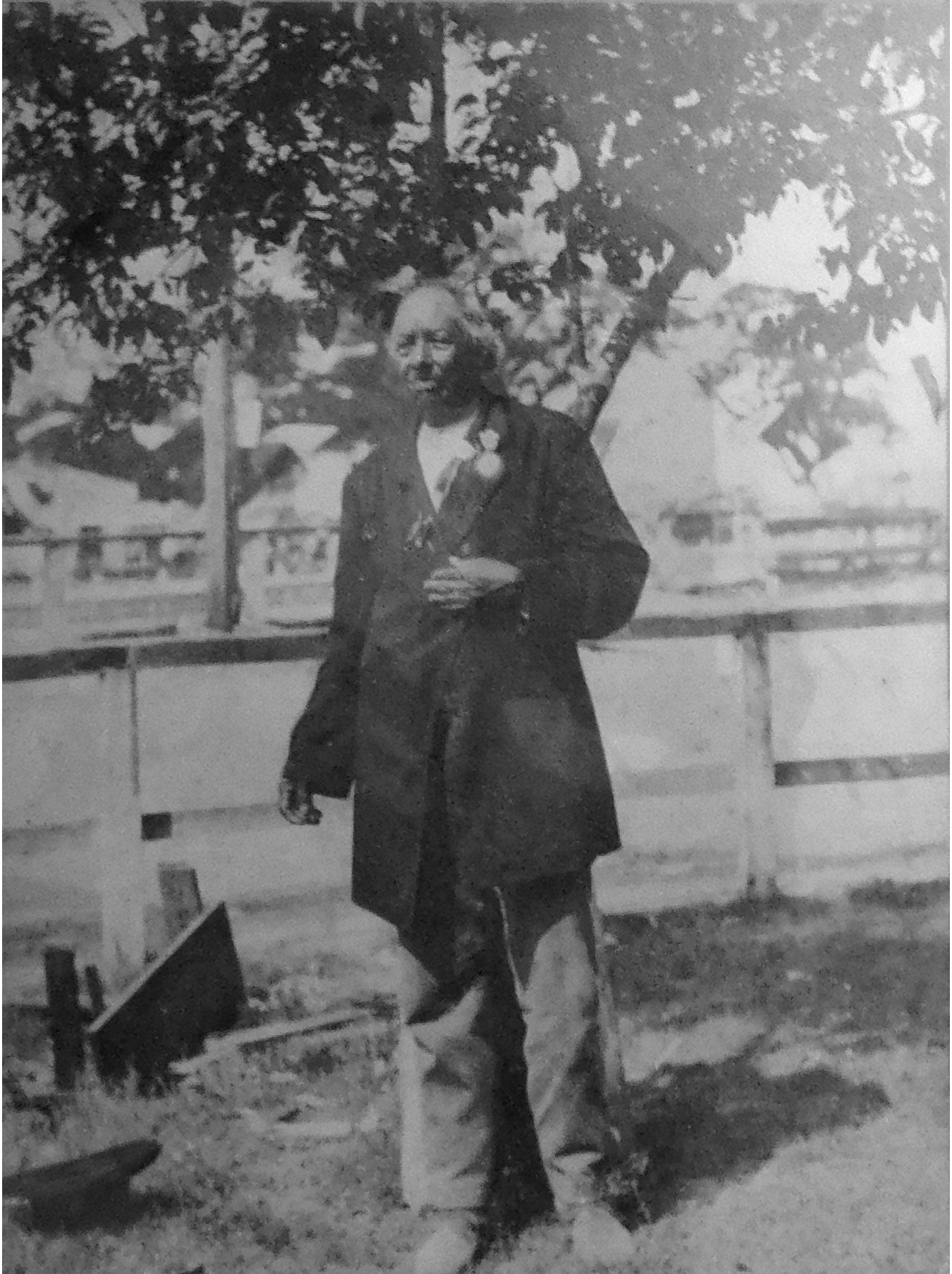
Choctaw Native American Jack Amos led rescue efforts to save drowning Confederate soldiers in the Chunky Creek Train Wreck of 1863.

When the American Civil War began in 1861, Meridian was a small village with several stores and hotels and two churches, one Baptist and one Methodist, which shared a Sunday School service. An academy had also been built, and the school was in full operation. The town's strategic position at the railroad junction led to the construction of a Confederate arsenal, military hospital, and prisoner-of-war stockade, as well as the headquarters for a number of state offices.

The Meridian Invincibles were established on May 1, 1861, under the command of W.F. Crumpton and William Spinks. On May 21, the Governor ordered the unit, which consisted of sixty-three members, to proceed to Corinth and go into camp under the command of Major General Charles Clark. The Invincibles eventually became Company H of the 14th Mississippi Infantry and would later see action at the Battle of Fort Donelson. They, along with 7000 confederate soldiers, would become prisoners of war.

On February 19, 1863, a train with one tender & four cars left the Meridian depot at 3:00 A.M. to transport Confederate soldiers and some civilians from Meridian to aid in the coming Battle of Vicksburg. After the train wrecked near Chunky, Mississippi, the 1st Choctaw Battalion, which had been organized days/weeks earlier at a camp near Newton Station, led rescue and recovery efforts.

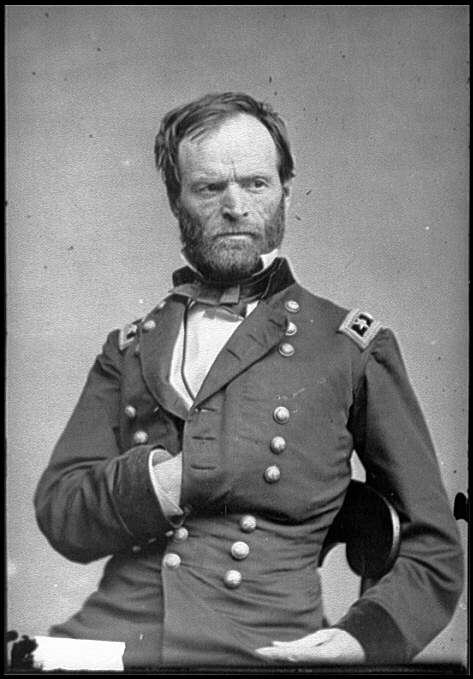
Union General William Tecumseh Sherman

The engineer was under military orders, and his long train of cars was filled with Confederate soldiers, who, like the engineer, were animated with but one impulse – to Vicksburg! to victory or death! Onward rushed the engineer. All passed over except the hindmost car. The bridge had swerved out of plumb, and into the raging waters with nearly one hundred soldiers the rear car was precipitated. "Help!" was the cry, but there was no help.

— S. G. Spann remarking about the Chunky Creek Train Wreck, 1905

After the 1863 Vicksburg campaign, Union forces under General William Tecumseh Sherman turned eastward toward the city to begin what would later be called the Battle of Meridian. Because of several feints and other confusing maneuvers performed by Sherman, Lieutenant General Leonidas Polk, leader of Confederate troops in the city, was convinced Sherman was headed not for Meridian but for Mobile, Alabama, so he decided to fall back to Demopolis, Alabama, and prepare for a rear attack, leaving the city and its surrounding territory to the mercy of the enemy.

Sherman reached Meridian on February 14, 1864. He and his army waited in the city for Brigadier General William Sooy Smith, whom Sherman had ordered to lead a small cavalry from Tennessee to rendezvous in the city and continue into Alabama. He gave up after a week and returned to Vicksburg on February 20. While he and his army were waiting, Sherman ordered his troops "to wipe the appointed meeting place off the map" by erasing the railroads on the map and burning much of the map. Among the damage was the destruction of an arsenal, immense storehouses, and the railroad in every direction. After the destruction of the city, Sherman is reported to have said, "Meridian with its depots, store-houses, arsenal, hospitals, offices, hotels, and cantonments no longer exists." Despite the destruction, the railroad lines in the city were rapidly repaired and operating again only 26 working days after the battle.

=== Reconstruction ===
Shortly after the Civil War a central business district grew in the downtown area, leading to a population increase. By 1870 the population had grown to 2,709, and the city was named the county seat of Lauderdale County. This short-term growth led to the establishment of several educational facilities, including the Meridian Female College, founded in 1865, as well as diverse religious institutions, including Presbyterian, Catholic, Jewish, and Episcopal. Before the war, most churches were either Baptist or Methodist. The growth during Reconstruction was set back when downtown was destroyed in a fire in 1871 during the Meridian race riot, related to freedmen's efforts to resist the Ku Klux Klan. Up to thirty black men were killed by a white mob.

In 1871, adding to the political turmoil, five different men served as mayor of the city.

The city quickly recovered and defined an 1872 fire district requiring buildings to be constructed of brick. The remainder of the 1870s saw hard times for the city, including economic troubles during the Panic of 1873, and a yellow fever epidemic in 1878. Yellow fever affected almost 500 residents, leaving at least 86 dead, which resulted in a quarantine in the city. Rail passengers entering the city were required to provide a health certificate certifying that they were free of the disease. Many of the fatalities from the riot and epidemic were buried in McLemore Cemetery. Despite these early troubles, the town experienced an economic boom and entered a "Golden Age" around the start of the 20th century.

== Golden Age ==
=== 1880–1900 ===
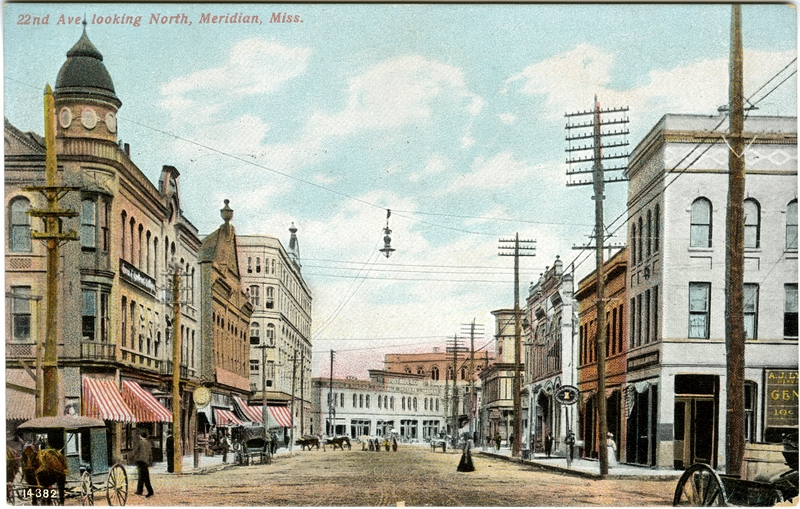
Postcard of downtown Meridian in its "golden age."

The city flourished during the 1880s, adding electricity, running water, a sewage system, and paved streets and sidewalks within its limits. By 1885 the city became the railroad center of eastern Mississippi because of its unique location at the junction of the Mobile and Ohio Railroad, the New Orleans and Northeastern Railroad, the Alabama and Vicksburg Railroad, the Alabama Great Southern Railroad, and the Kansas City, Memphis and Birmingham Railroad. The railroads provided for a means of transportation and an influx of industries, which caused a population boom. The 1870 population of 2,709 almost tripled by 1885 to around 8,000 and nearly doubled again to 15,000 by 1898. By 1906 the population had almost doubled again to reach 28,000, and the city was given the nickname "The Queen City." Between 1890 and 1930, Meridian was the largest city in Mississippi and a leading center for manufacturing in the South.

As the population grew, a commercial district developed in the downtown area, made accessible by a mule-drawn trolley system that connected different parts of the city. The company that oversaw that system was the Meridian Street Railway Company, organized in 1883. At its peak the mule-drawn line included about four miles of track throughout the city. Industry profits helped finance the construction of most of the city's major buildings, including the Grand Opera House and its associated Marks-Rothenberg Store, which opened in 1890. The opera house, listed on the National Register of Historic Places, was combined with the neighboring Marks-Rothenberg Department Store and renovated in 2006 into an upscale theater and conference center. Together the buildings now make up "The Mississippi State University Riley Center for Education and Performing Arts." A significant business that developed in this period was Soulé Steam Feed Works, incorporated by George W. Soulé in 1893, which industrialized cotton and helped grow the lumber industry in the city. Partly due to Soulé's business, Mississippi was ranked sixth among the states in cotton seed production by the 1920s.

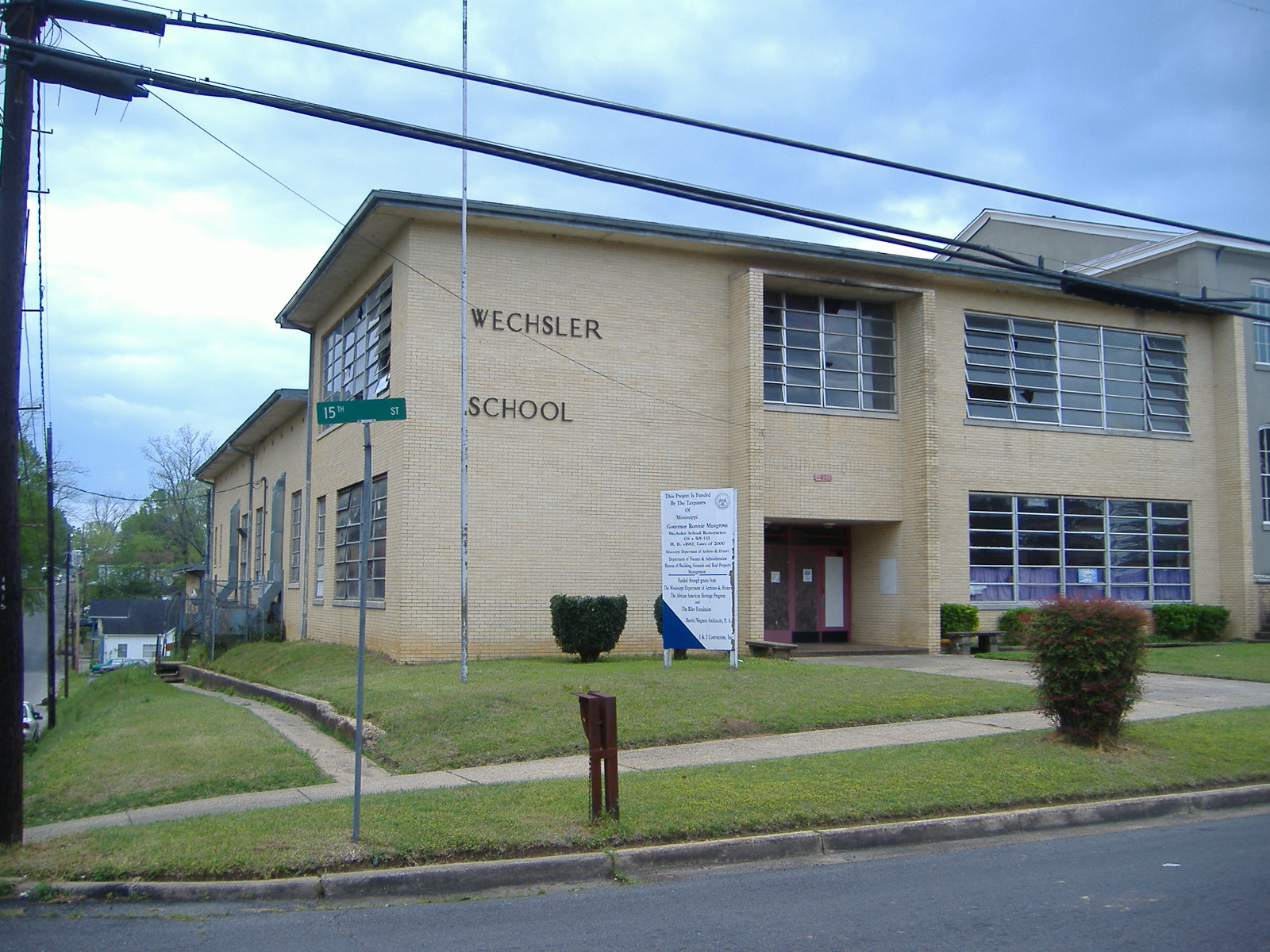
Wechsler School, the first brick public school for blacks in the state

In 1894 the Wechsler School was built as the first brick public school building in the state for African-American children, after the full community passed a bond issue to build the substantial school. The school served the city until 1978. Since then, the building has been used by a variety of community organizations. The school was added to the National Register of Historic Places on July 15, 1991, and in 1994 ownership of the building was transferred to the Wechsler Community Art Association. The association has a multi-year plan to renovate the building for extended community use.

By 1897 the mule-drawn trolley system was replaced by an electric trolley system, operated by the Meridian Street Railway and Power Company. The addition of this system increased economic activity in the downtown area and allowed the city to spread out. The trolley system eventually reached up to 10 miles (16 km) north of the downtown area. By 1907, the lines connected various locations in the city including main tracks following 8th and 5th streets as well as several offshoots to peripheral communities. The most common stop for the streetcars during this era was Highland Park, located at the end of the 34th Avenue line. Another common stop for streetcar riders was the Grand Opera House; in fact, for years streetcars were the primary mode of transportation to the Opera House for residents of the city. One limitation of the streetcar system, however, was that it could not pass over the railroad tracks on the south side of downtown, so the southernmost neighborhoods were unable to receive service.

=== Turn of the century ===
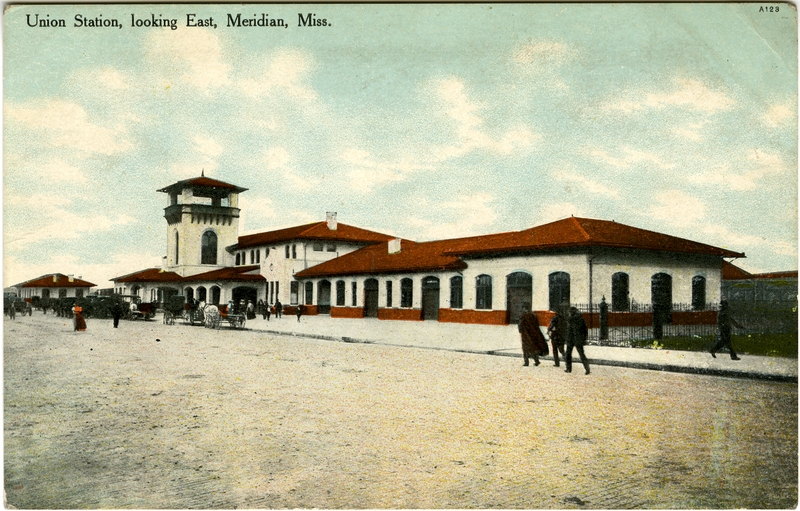
Postcard of Meridian's Union Station, built in 1906

With traffic increasing due to a growing population, the city built Union Station in 1906 to coordinate all the railroads. Along with Union Station, several hotels were built, including Hotel Meridian, Grand Avenue Hotel, Terminal Hotel, and Union Hotel. By 1907 an average of 40 trains per day passed through the city, and the various railroad companies provided over 6,000 jobs to the city's residents. By 1920 as many as 100 trains per day passed through the station. The passenger station's central tower was demolished in the 1940s, and further demolition took place in 1966, but the city has since rebuilt the station in its original Mission Revival style. After its completion in 1996, the station was renamed the Meridian Multi-Modal Transportation Center.

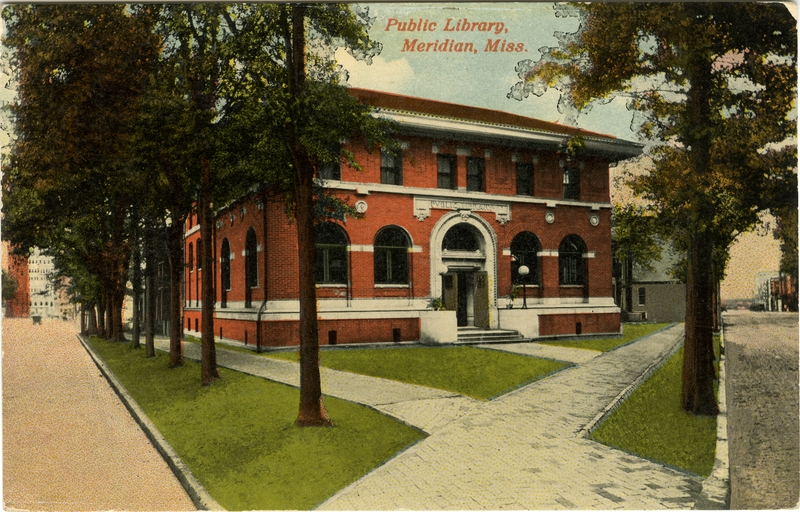
One of Meridian's Carnegie libraries is now the Meridian Museum of Art

The Fortnightly Book and Magazine Club, formed in the 1880s, built wide support for a Carnegie library in the city in 1908. Israel Marks, a city leader, also led a group including Professor Shaw, Professor Triplett, Dr. Howard, Jeff Wilson, Frank Berry, Henry Strayhorn, and John Harris, to raise money for an African-American library. The club women enlisted Marks to approach the national philanthropist Andrew Carnegie for funding assistance.

Two Carnegie libraries were built in 1913 — one for whites and one for African Americans. The latter was the first and only library for blacks in the state until after World War I and is the only Carnegie library ever built for African Americans in the country. The library for whites was established in a building originally owned by members of the First Presbyterian Church of Meridian, who sold it to the city on September 25, 1911. The city used the library for whites until 1970, when it was renovated and converted into the Meridian Museum of Art. The library for African Americans was built at 13th Street and 28th Avenue on land donated by St. Paul Methodist Church. It served various community uses after the Civil Rights Act of 1964 ended segregated facilities. Despite the demolition of the former African-American library on May 28, 2008, both buildings are currently listed on the National Register of Historic Places.

=== World Wars I and II ===
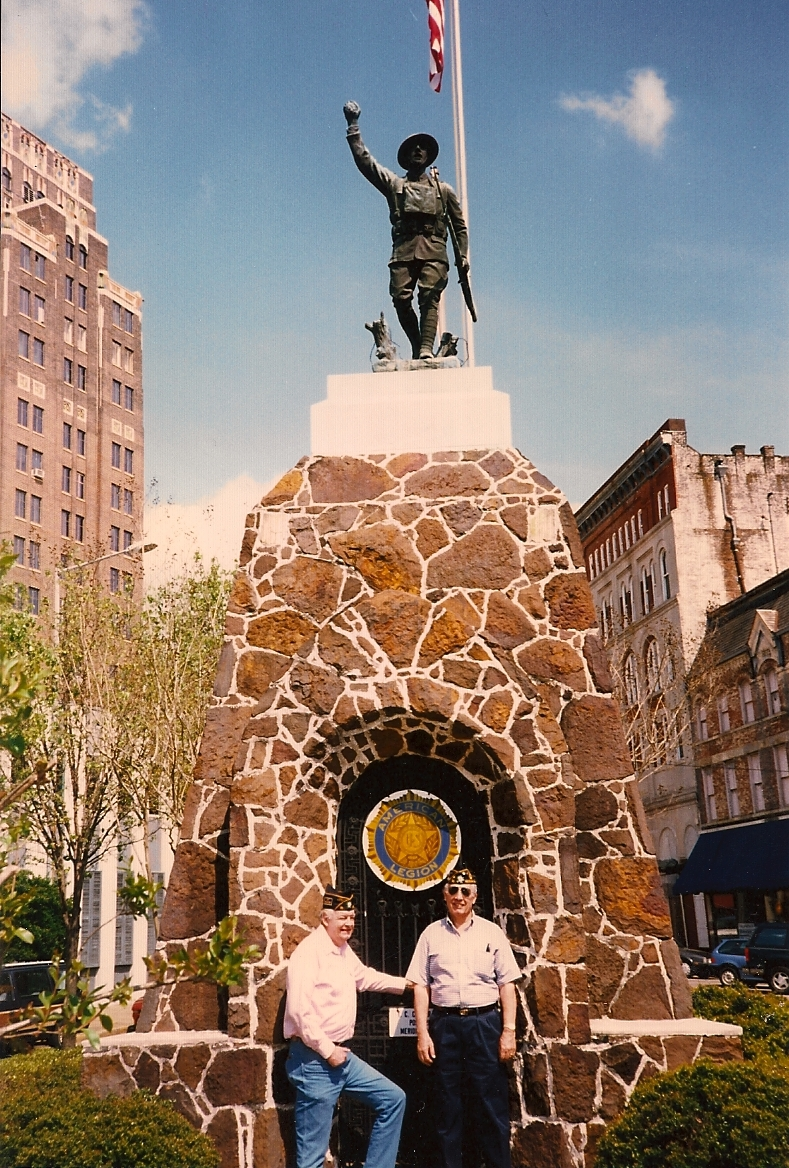
The doughboy monument, erected after World War I to honor Meridianites lost in battle.

When a commission government brought 90 industrial plants to the city in 1913, industry in the city began attracting many settlers from the surrounding areas, causing the city's population to continue to climb into the 1920s. After World War I, the city erected a monument on the corner of 6th Street and 23rd Avenue depicting a doughboy in uniform to honor fallen soldiers from the city and surrounding area. During the industry boom of the 1920s, Meridian's automobile industry began to grow. Livery stables that were built around the city later evolved into service stations for vehicles. The former streetcar system was replaced by a system of buses with the creation of the Mississippi Power Company in 1925. Buses were seen as a superior mode of transportation at the time, especially since the buses could pass freely over the railroads which divided the city's southernmost neighborhoods from the downtown area and the rest of the city.

In 1929 the Threefoot Building, Meridian's tallest skyscraper of seventeen stories, was built in the Art Deco architectural style. Today, the historic building, located adjacent to the former Grand Opera House, is an important city landmark and is a contributing building within the Meridian Downtown Historic District, one of nine recognized historic districts in the city.

Even through the stock market crash of 1929 and the following Great Depression, the city still attracted new businesses from surrounding counties. With high unemployment and low wages, though, escapism became popular not only in the city but in the entire nation. People began going to the theater to watch movies about the lavish lives of the rich and "escape" the troubles of their own lives. Capitalizing on this mindset was the S. H. Kress & Co. store chain with an outlet on 5th Street. Samuel Henry Kress, art collector and owner of the chain, exploited the cheap and readily available labor and materials of the time to build lavish stores to "provide luxury to the common man."

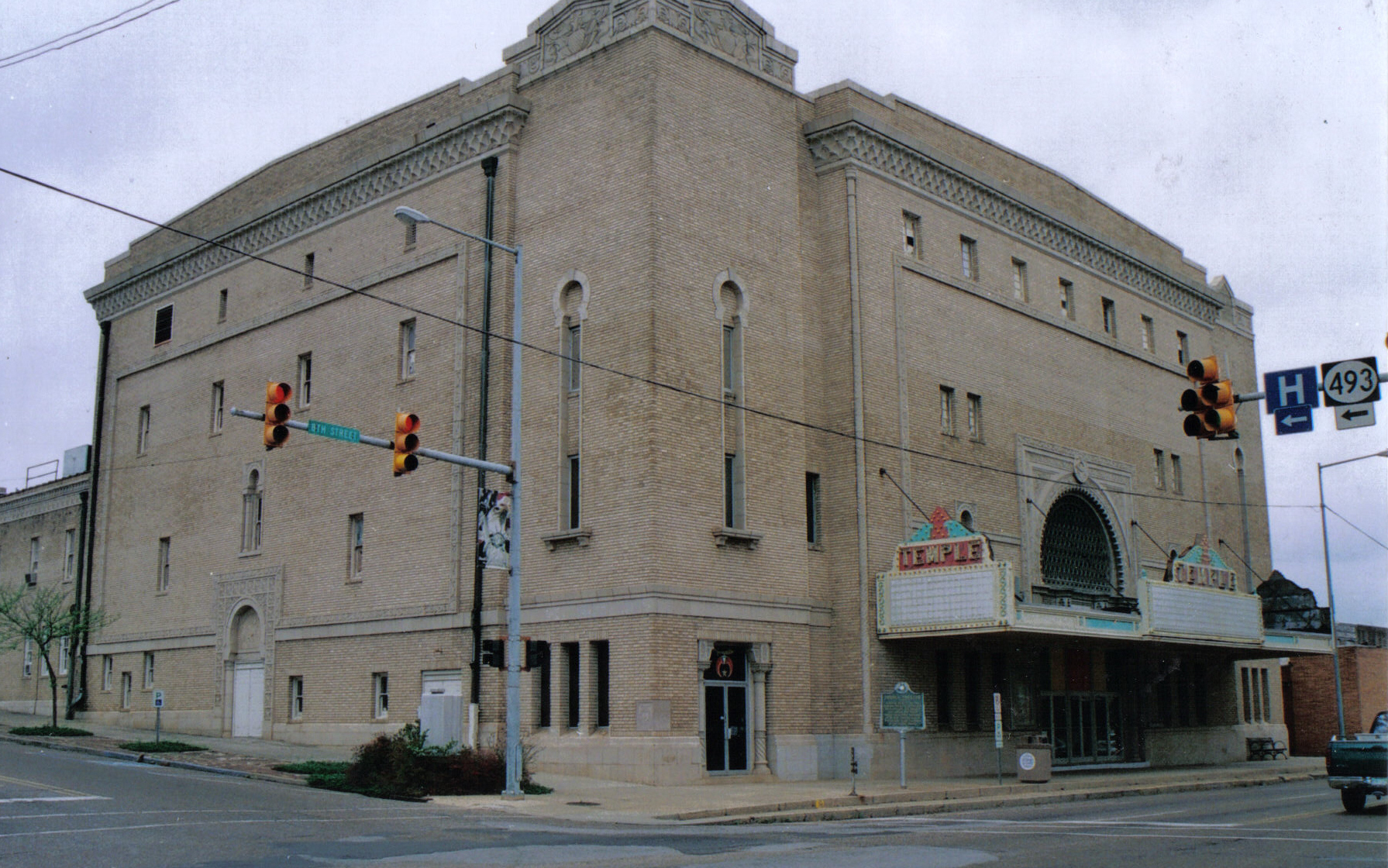
Meridian's Temple Theater

With popular culture moving from on-stage performances to motion pictures, the Grand Opera House became obsolete and was replaced by the Temple Theater. The new theater was constructed in 1928 by the Hamasa Shrine. With seating for 1800 persons, the Temple Theater was much bigger than the Opera House, allowing more visitors at a time. The theater currently houses one of only two Robert Morton pipe organs, equivalent to a 100-piece symphony orchestra, still installed in its original location in Mississippi.

After a short stall of the city's economy during the height of the Depression, the New Deal sparked renovation of some of the city's buildings including the Lauderdale County Courthouse in 1939. After about three more years of slow recovery, the nation entered World War II, providing an economic spark to the city. Railroads were essential to transport gasoline and scrap metal to build military vehicles, so Meridian served as the region's railroad center once again. This renewed prosperity lasted until the 1950s when the automobile and Interstate Highway System became more popular than passenger rails. The decline of the railroad industry caused significant job losses, whose combined economic impact resulted in a population decline as workers left for other areas. The population has since continued to decrease as the city has struggled to create a modern economy based on newer industries.

== Civil Rights Movement ==
During the height of the American Civil Rights Movement in the 1960s, Meridian was a major center of organizing and activism. The Congress of Racial Equality (CORE) had a field office there, with members including James Chaney and other local residents, along with Michael and Rita Schwerner and Andrew Goodman, volunteers from the North. They worked on creating a community center, preparing people in the area for voter registration, and organizing a boycott of a variety store that had yet to hire its first black worker.

The activism from Northerners was not widely accepted among local residents; it caused great tension between not only white and black citizens of Meridian, but whites and blacks throughout the South. Racial tension often translated to violence. In June 1964 Chaney, Schwerner and Goodman went to Neshoba County, Mississippi, to meet with members of a black church which had been bombed and burned. The three young men disappeared that night on their way back to Meridian.

Two months later authorities discovered the bodies of the men buried in an earthen dam. The federal government indicted seventeen Klansmen, and tried ten for conspiracy under the Enforcement Act of 1870. Seven men were convicted and three were acquitted. In 2005 the case was reopened; Edgar Ray Killen, one of the Klansmen, was convicted of three counts of manslaughter and sentenced to three terms of 20 years each.

The murders of Chaney, Goodman, and Schwerner — along with years of work from other activists — helped gain national support for Federal legislation to end segregation and protect civil and voting rights of all citizens. Meridian later honored Chaney by renaming a portion of 49th Ave after him. The city has also held a Mississippi Civil Rights Martyrs Memorial Service each year since 1964 and built a memorial at his gravesite located in Okatibee Cemetery, by Okatibee Baptist Church.

In 2014, the Meridian/Lauderdale County Tourism Bureau in cooperation with a committee of local residents, created the Civil Rights Trail. It is a self-guided tour consisting of eighteen stops beginning with the African-American Business District and ending with Chaney's gravesite.

== Downtown Revitalization ==
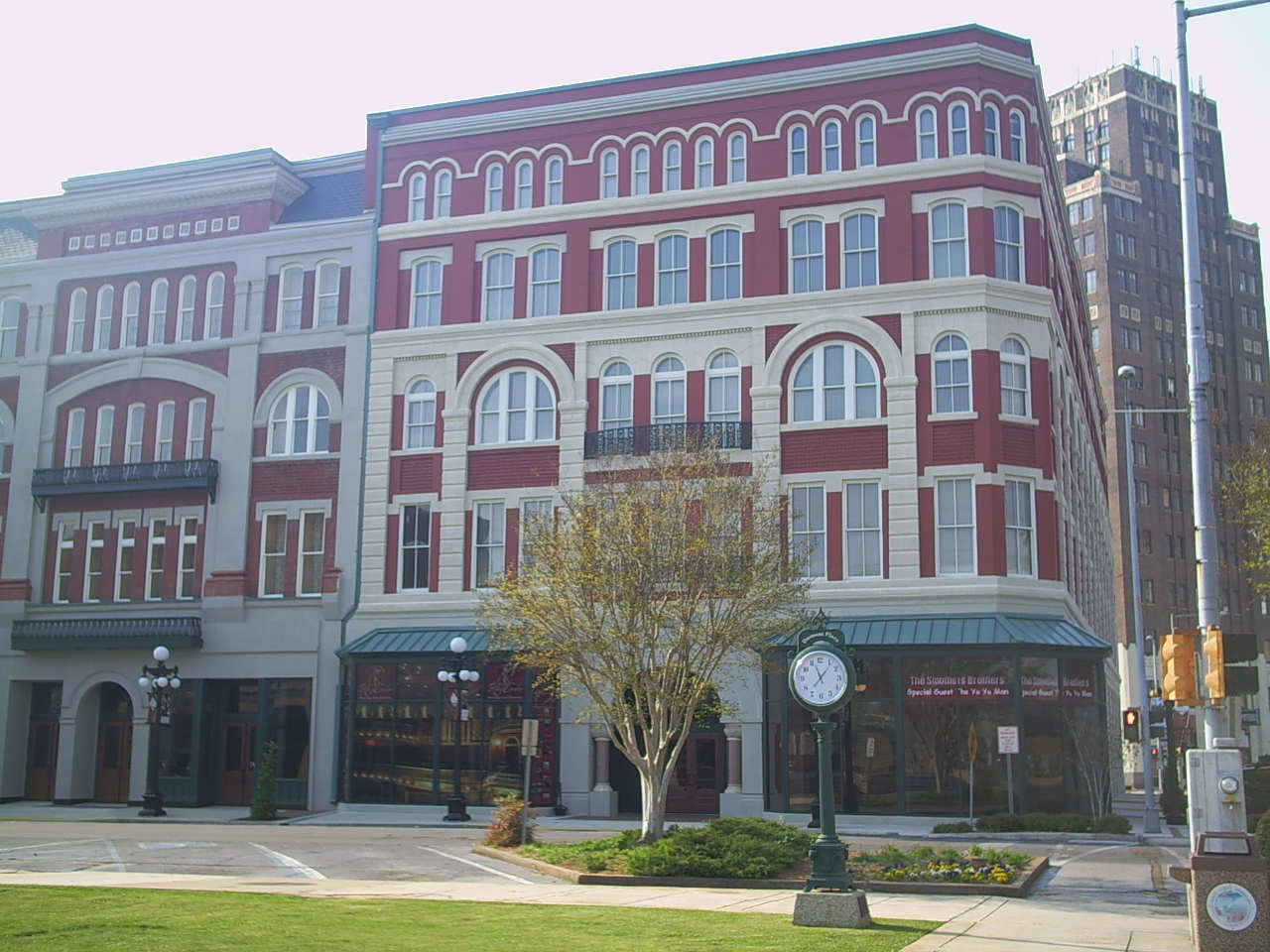
Meridian's Riley Center, renovated in 2006

Meridian's downtown core had begun to disappear after World War II. As citizens began to move away from downtown in favor of new subdivisions north of downtown, strip commercial interests began to move downtown. To attempt to save the historic nature of the city's downtown district and other areas, several areas were designated historic districts in the 1970s and 80s. Meridian now contains nine historic districts, all listed on the National Register of Historic Places. The Meridian Historic Districts and Landmarks Commission was created in 1979 and the Meridian Main Street program was founded in 1985.

In 1997 Meridian Main Street helped organize the construction of a new Amtrak Station based on the design of the historic train station used during Meridian's Golden Age which had been demolished. The construction of the Amtrak station and linking of transportation modes sparked a citywide effort to restore downtown to its lively prosperity of the early 20th century.

In 2001, the Rosenbaum Building was renovated and reopened containing condominiums on the upper floors and retail stores on the street level. Weidmann's restaurant, built around 1870, was sold to a group of local investors and reopened in fall 2002 after extensive renovations. Meridian Main Street, along with The Riley Foundation, helped renovate the historic Grand Opera House in 2006 into the "Mississippi State University Riley Center for Education and the Performing Arts." A 6-story parking garage, built to provide parking for the future Riley Center, opened in 2005.

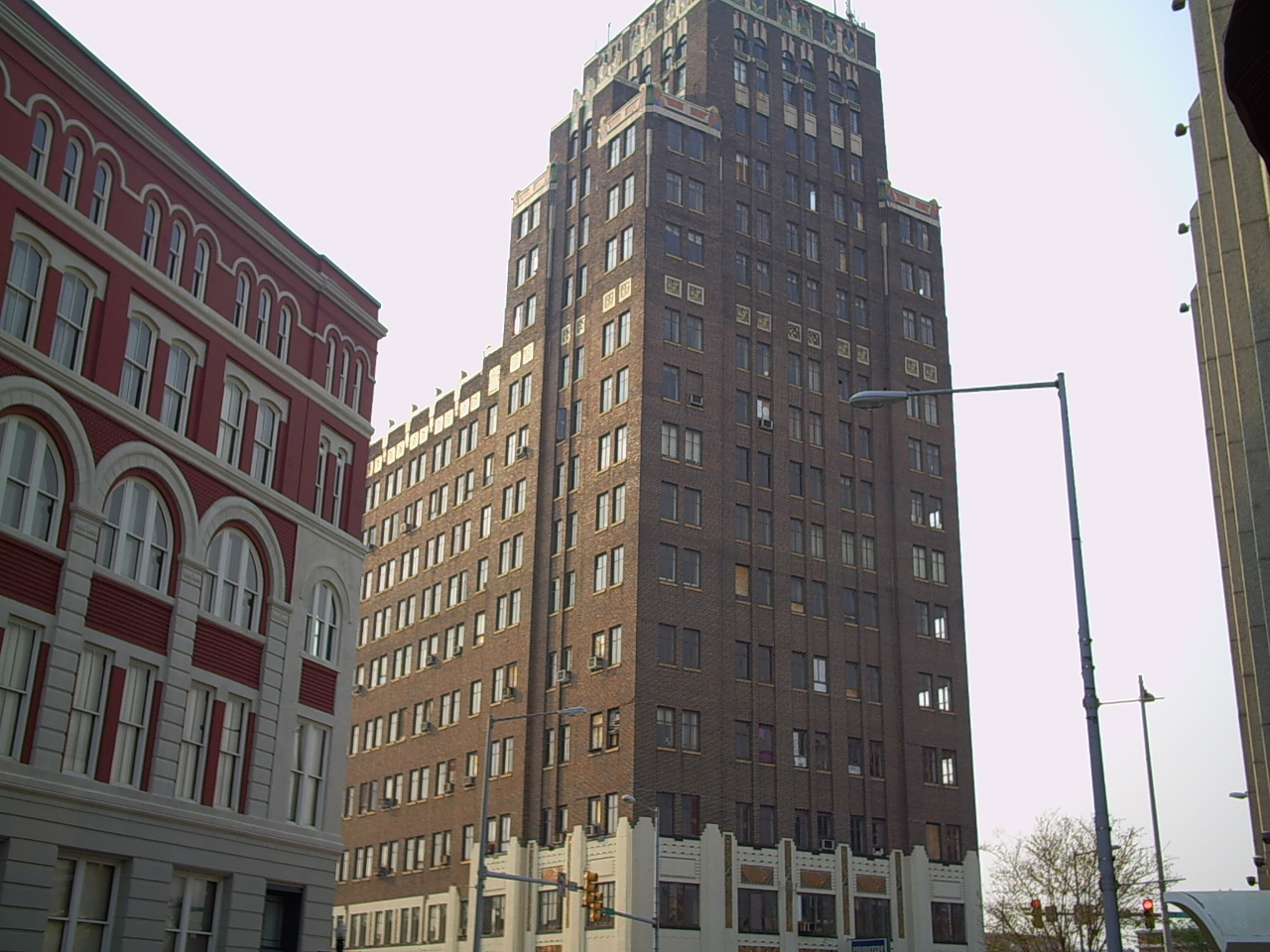
The Threefoot Building, now renovated as a luxury hotel.

Meridian Main Street was handed over to the Alliance for Downtown Meridian in late 2007 after the Mississippi Main Street Association, the statewide coordinator of all local Main Street organizations, ordered local governments operating these organizations in the public sector to turn them over to the private sector.

The downtown revitalization effort is now spearheaded by a collaboration of three privately owned organizations: the Alliance for Downtown Meridian, Meridian Main Street, and the Meridian Downtown Association. Though the three organizations are separate entities, the Alliance serves as an umbrella organization, allowing the Meridian Downtown Association and Meridian Main Street to use its support staff and housing, and in turn the Alliance serves as a liaison between the organizations.

Plans were underway for the Alliance to renovate the Threefoot Building into a mixed-use development before the end of 2009; however, as of January 2010, Mayor Cheri Barry has ended the city's relationship with HRI Properties.

Today the Alliance helps to promote further development and restoration downtown and has been designated by the city as the official downtown economic development program, receiving partial funding from the city. The remainder and majority of the organization's funding, however, comes from donations from downtown businesses. The Alliance has stated that it focuses on assisting businesses like specialty shops, restaurants, and bars because these types of businesses help downtown become more active during the day and at night. The Meridian Downtown Association, which is completely privately funded, is primarily focused on increasing foot traffic downtown by organizing special events, and the Meridian Main Street program supports existing businesses downtown.

Other designed and proposed projects in the city include several museums in downtown and an African-American Business District on 5th Street, as well as several murals and public arts projects on various buildings' facades.

== Hotels ==
Historic hotels in Meridian
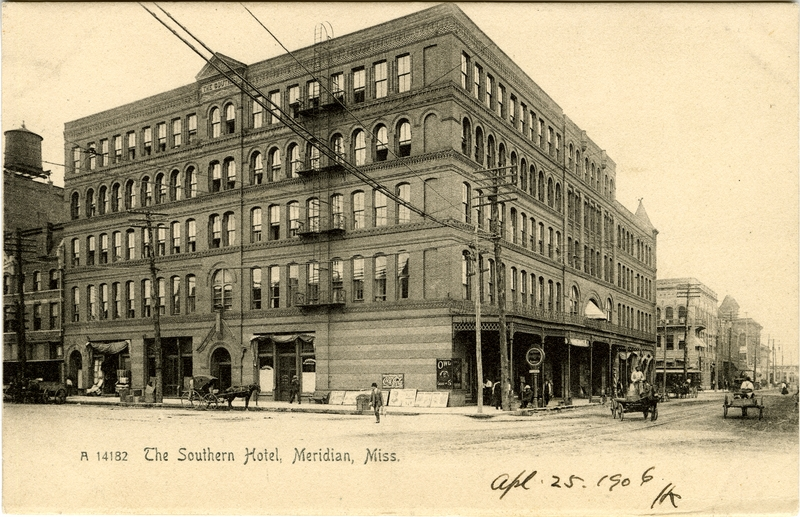
Great Southern Hotel (1890)

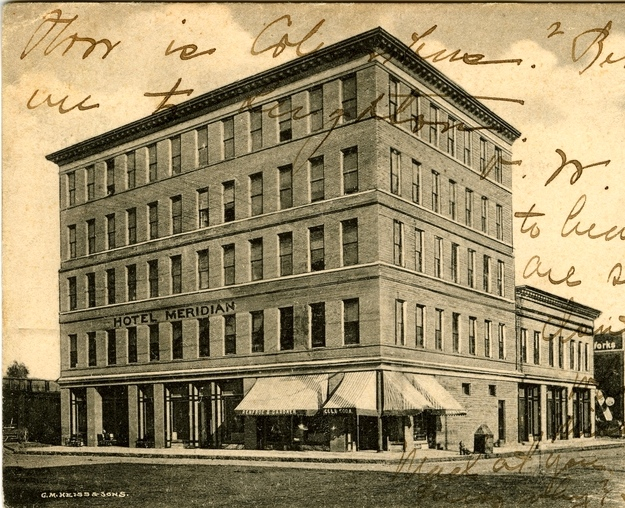
Hotel Meridian (1907)

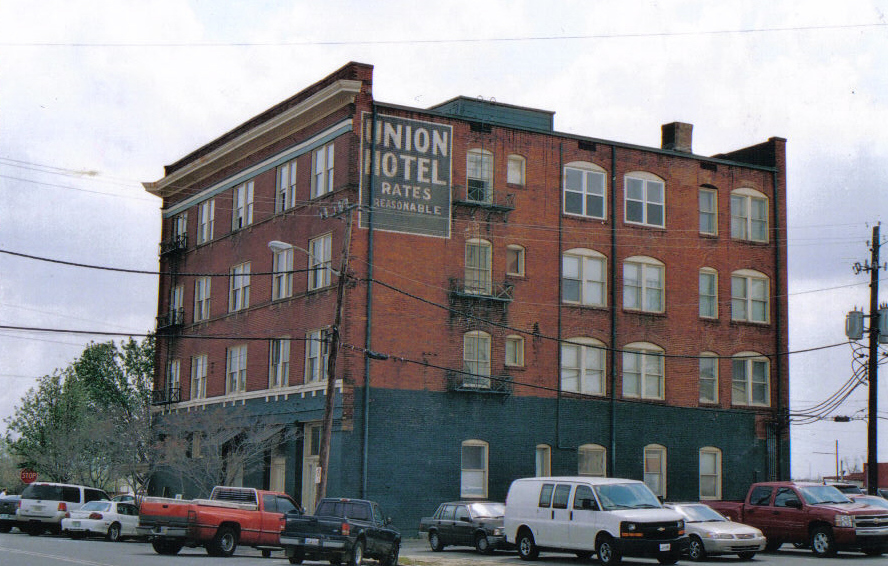
Union Hotel (1908)

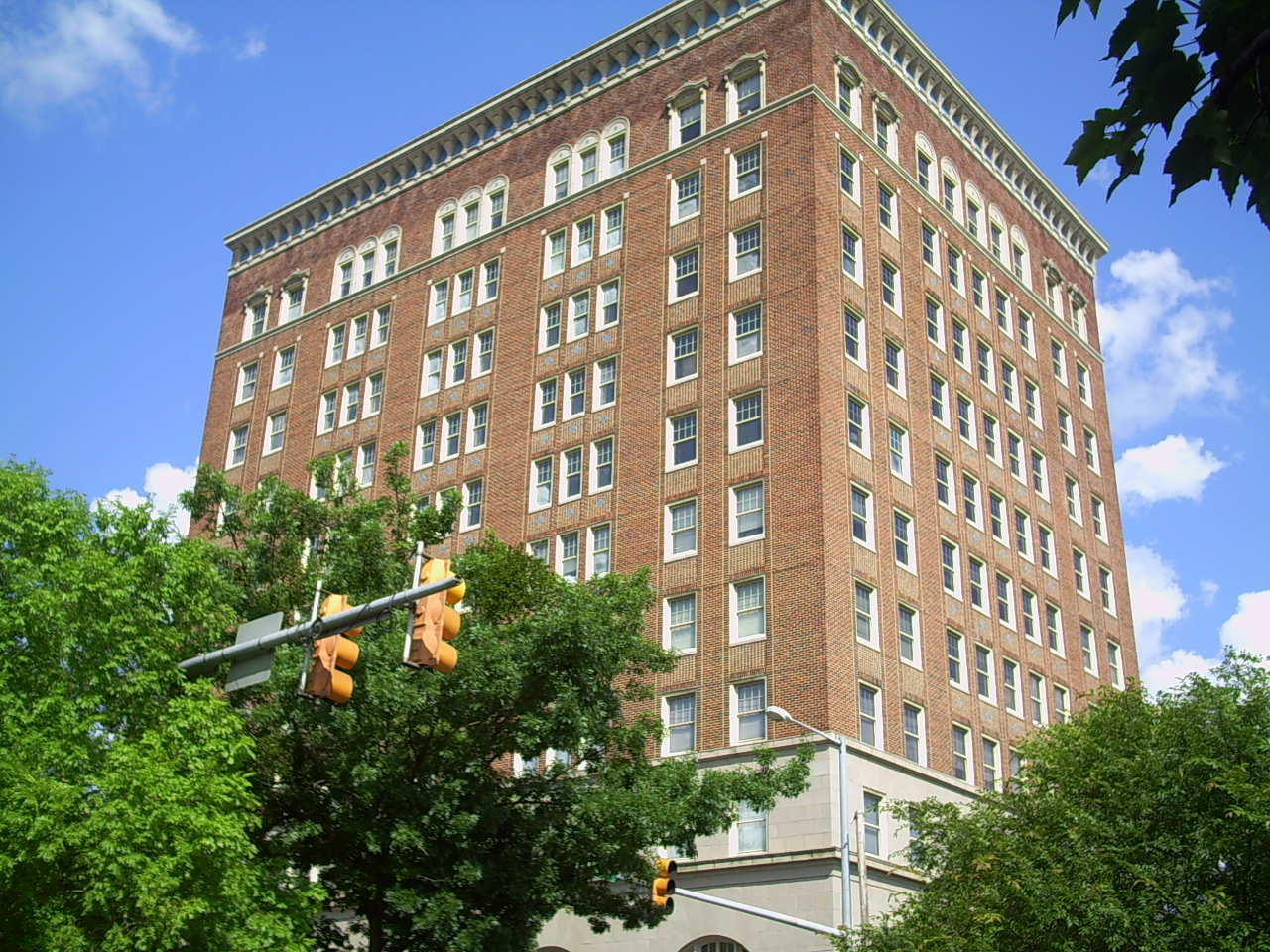
Lamar Hotel (1927)

Many historic hotels have existed in Meridian throughout its history. Even before Meridian reached its "Golden Age," several large hotels including the Great Southern and the Grand Avenue hotels were built around the start of the 20th century. With the growth of the railroads and the construction of the original Union Station in 1906, many hotels were constructed for passengers and workers. The Elmira Hotel was constructed in 1905, and the Terminal Hotel was constructed in 1910. Hotel Meridian was constructed in 1907, and Union Hotel was built in 1908. Union Hotel was listed on the National Register of Historic Places in 1979, and both Hotel Meridian and Grand Avenue Hotel were listed as contributing properties to the Meridian Urban Center Historic District.

As the city grew, the hotels grew as well, as evidenced by the eleven-story skyscraper Lamar Hotel built in 1927. Lamar Hotel today serves as a county annex building and was listed on the National Register of Historic Places in 1979. It was also listed as a Mississippi Landmark in 1988.

Another historic hotel was established in 1931, the E.F. Young Hotel. A staple in the African American business district that grew west of the city's core, the hotel was one of the only places in the city a travelling African American could find a room.

As the city became more suburb-focused in the 1960s and '70s, most hotels moved outside of downtown, but there has been a push for a new downtown hotel, sparked by the rehabilitation of the Riley Center in 2006. The Threefoot Building has been the main focus of these efforts; however, the hotel remains unrestored.

== Historic districts ==
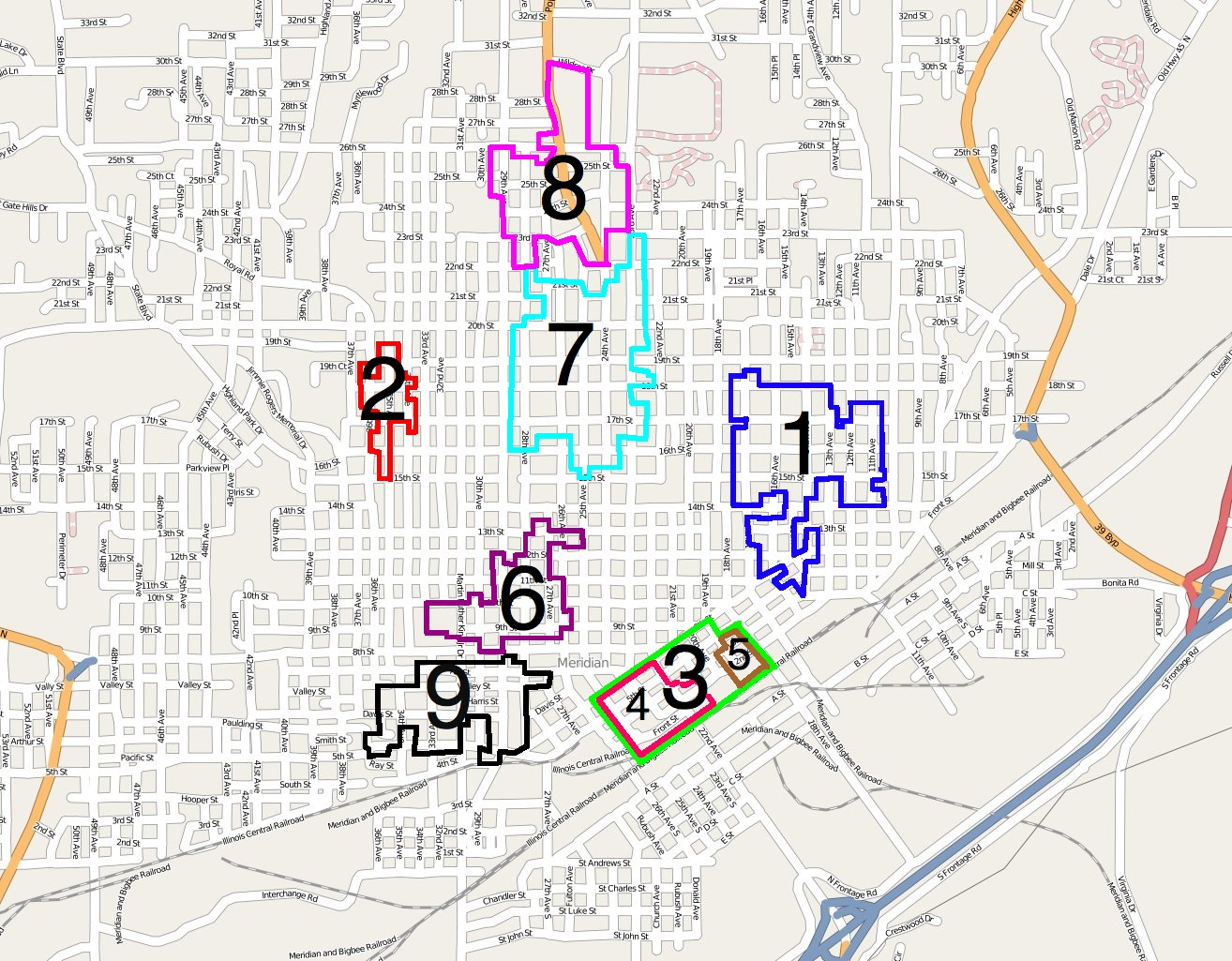

Meridian contains nine historic districts listed on the National Register of Historic Places, illustrating the city's rich history. One district, the Meridian Downtown Historic District, is a combination of two older districts, the Meridian Urban Center Historic District and the Union Station Historic District. Many architectural styles are present in the districts, most from the late 19th and early 20th centuries, including Queen Anne, Colonial Revival, Italianate, Art Deco, Late Victorian, and Bungalow. The districts are:

1 East End Historic District — roughly bounded by 18th St, 11th Ave, 14th St, 14th Ave, 5th St, and 17th Ave.

2 Highlands Historic District — roughly bounded by 15th St, 34th Ave, 19th St, and 36th Ave.

3 Meridian Downtown Historic District — runs from the former Gulf, Mobile and Ohio Railroad north to 6th St between 18th and 26th Ave, excluding Ragsdale Survey Block 71.

4 Meridian Urban Center Historic District — roughly bounded by 21st and 25th Aves, 6th St, and the railroad.

5 Union Station Historic District — roughly bounded by 18th and 19th Aves, 5th St, and the railroad.

6 Merrehope Historic District — roughly bounded by 33rd Ave, 30th Ave, 14th St, and 8th St.

7 Mid-Town Historic District — roughly bounded by 23rd Ave, 15th St, 28th Ave, and 22nd St.

8 Poplar Springs Road Historic District — roughly bounded by 29th St, 23rd Ave, 22nd St, and 29th Ave.

9 West End Historic District — roughly bounded by 7th St, 28th Ave, Shearer's Branch, and 5th St.
