= Hotels in Meridian, Mississippi =

The numerous historic hotels in Meridian, Mississippi, provide insights into the city's growth and expansion, both in the late 19th and early 20th centuries and into the modern age. Many hotels were built in downtown Meridian in the early 1900s to provide lodging for passengers of the railroad, which was essential to the city's growth at the turn of the 20th century. Two of these historic hotels–the Union Hotel, built in 1910, and the Lamar Hotel, built in 1927–have been listed on the National Register of Historic Places.

Others, including the E.F. Young Hotel, owned and operated by an African-American entrepreneur, have been recognized as contributing properties to the Meridian Downtown Historic District. Today, most hotels in the city are located in post-World War II suburban developments. Urban activists are working to establish a downtown hotel to aid in revitalizing the city's core and support the theater. The Threefoot Building, a former office building, has been considered for renovation and adaptation as a hotel.

== Nineteenth century hotels ==
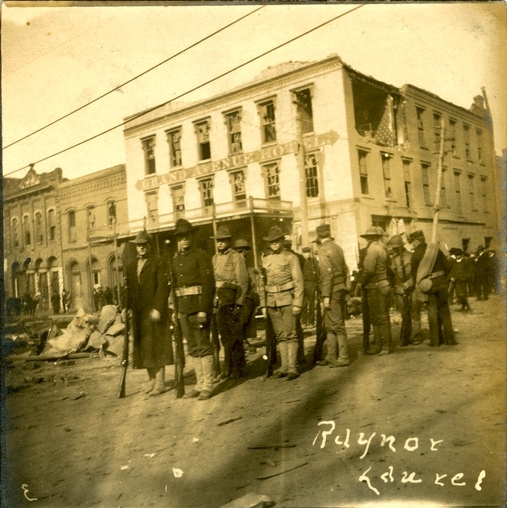
The Grand Avenue Hotel, built in 1890, was damaged by a tornado on March 2, 1906.

Even before the city was officially established in 1860, hotels had been built, on the strength of the proposed linking of the Mobile and Ohio Railroad and the Vicksburg and Montgomery Railroad. After Sherman's raid of the city in 1864 during the American Civil War, only four buildings remained standing. One of those was the Jones House, used as a hotel, at the corner of the present-day 25th Avenue and 5th Street. Another hotel, the Ragsdale House, was built just after the war in 1865 near the train station. This three-story building provided a wooden-covered walkway for its customers leading directly over the dirt road to the train station, a luxury that other hotels did not have.

Other major hotels built before Meridian's "Golden Age", from 1890 to 1930, include the Phoenix Hotel at 26th Avenue and 7th Street, built in the early 1870s and destroyed by fire in 1876; the St. Charles Hotel and St. Bernard Hotel, both built in 1881; and the International Hotel, built in 1884. The owner of the International Hotel was Felix Weidmann, who had founded Weidmann's Restaurant in 1870. In the early 21st century, Weidmann's is the oldest operating restaurant in the state of Mississippi.

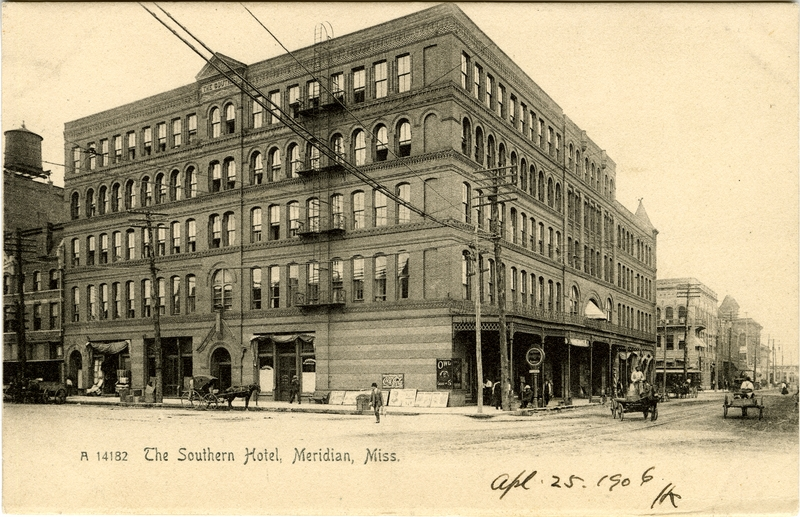
The Great Southern Hotel was built in 1890 at 6th Street and 23rd Avenue.

Two more hotels were built in 1890: the Grand Avenue Hotel and the Great Southern Hotel. The Grand Avenue Hotel was located a block away from the train station and appealed to families accompanying students traveling to and from the Meridian Male College. The Grand Avenue was damaged, along with a large portion of downtown, by a tornado on March 2, 1906. Several photographs of the damage in the city were taken from the hotel's second floor balcony. The building was rebuilt, however, and survived into the late 20th century. It was listed as a contributing property to the Meridian Urban Center Historic District in 1979.

The Great Southern Hotel–described by Jack Shank, a local historian, as "the hotel"–was five stories tall and contained 150 rooms. Costing $175,000 (today $6,124,000) and taking up half a city block at 6th Street and 23rd Avenue, the building was the largest and most expensive in the city. A restaurant was located on the roof, and a number of social events were held in second-floor parlors. Luxuries standard in the hotel included ceiling fans and reading lamps in every room, ornate oak woodwork throughout the building, and a public stenographer to assist patrons.

== Union Station ==
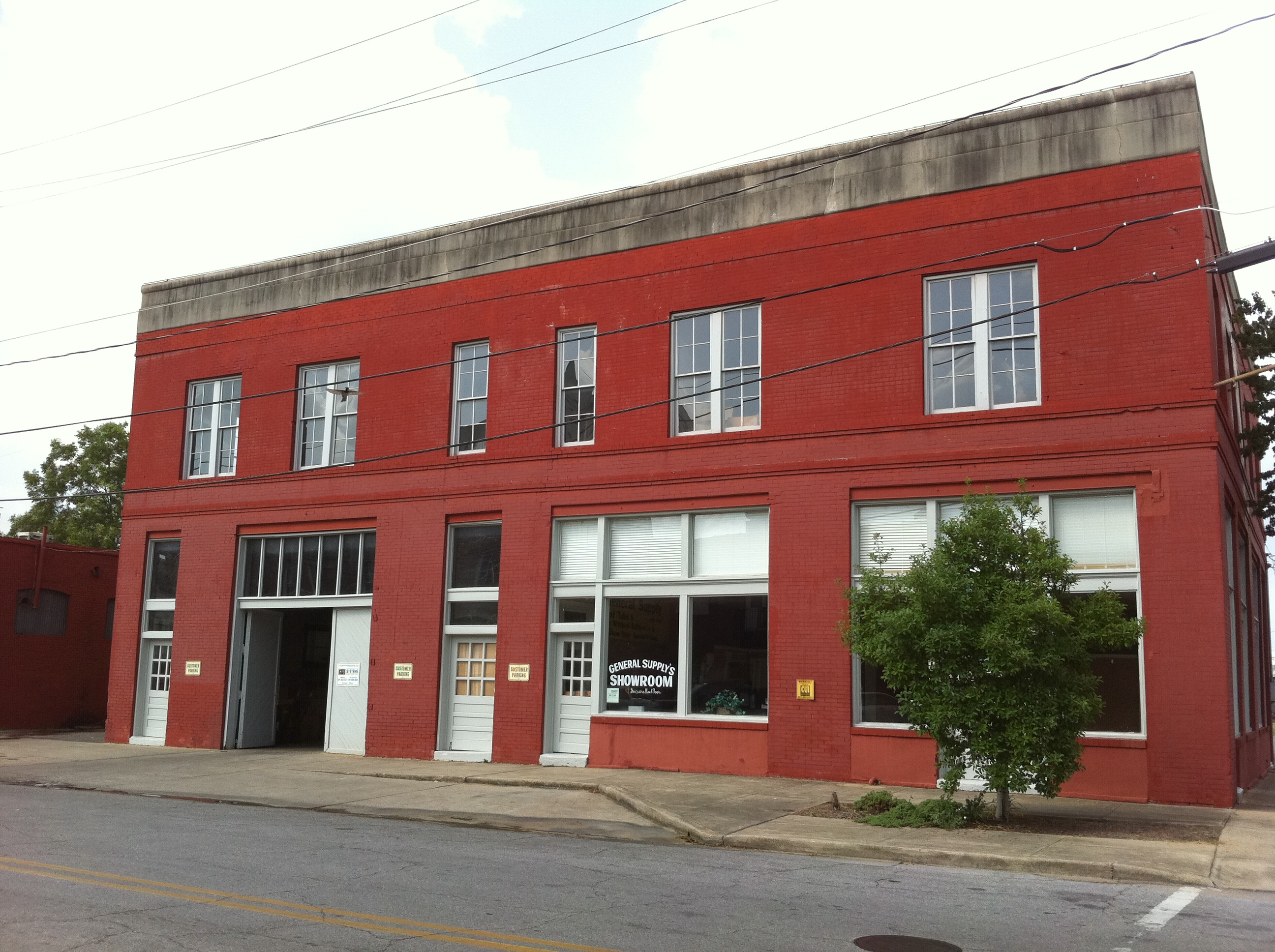
Elmira Hotel (1905)

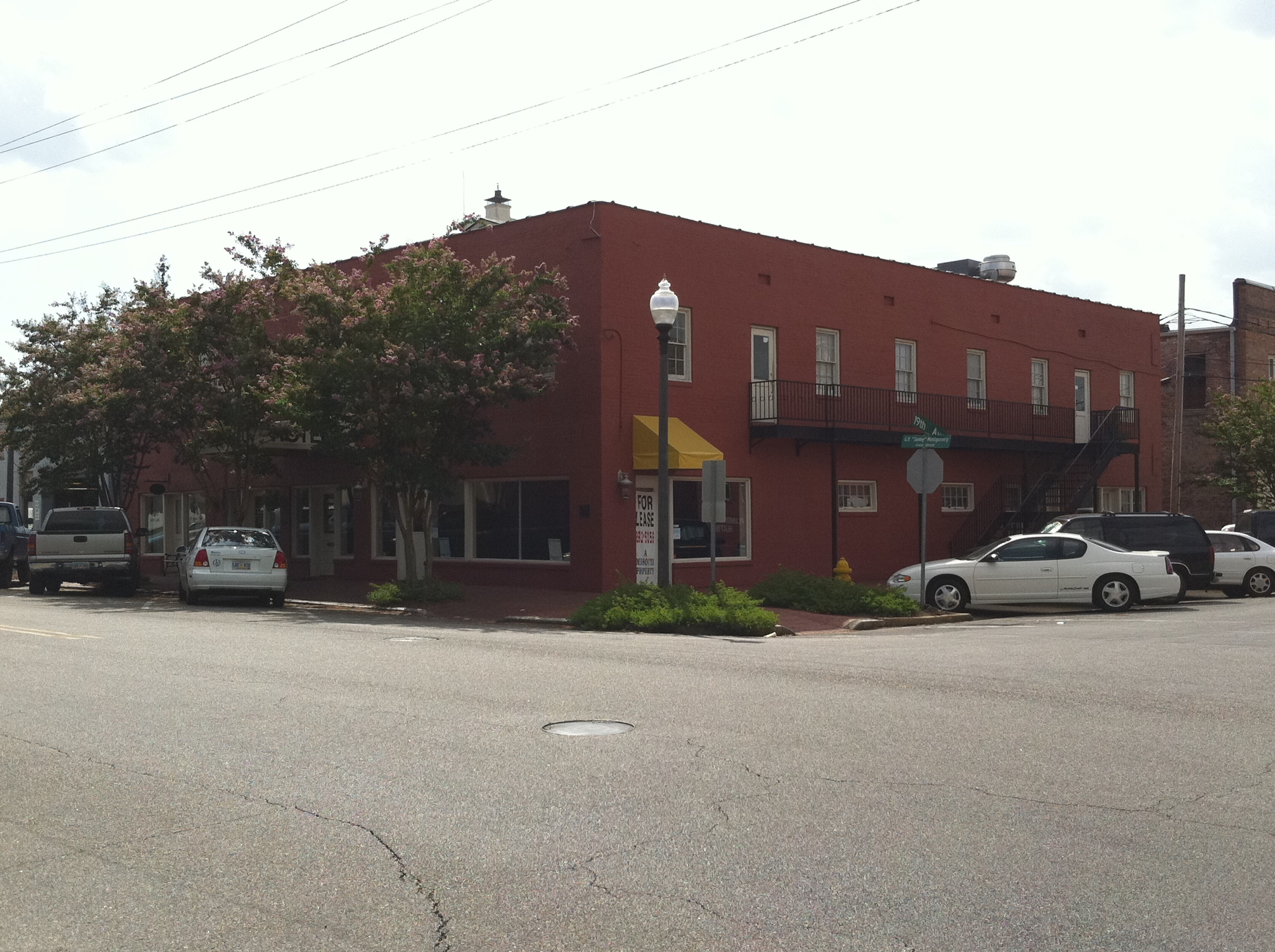
Terminal Hotel (1910)

With the construction of Union Station in 1906, hotel development was stimulated. The Elmira Hotel, now located at 1804 Front Street, was built in 1905 just before Union Station was completed. In 1910 the Terminal Hotel was constructed across the street at 1902 Front Street. Both hotels provided rooms for travelers passing through Union Station. In 1997 Union Station was expanded and restored. Since then these two hotels have been rehabilitated, along with many other downtown buildings in the following years as development has been stimulated.

=== Hotel Meridian ===
Also seeking to profit from the construction of Union Station and expectation of increased passenger traffic, local businessman Louis H. Arky opened the five-story Hotel Meridian two blocks from the station in August 1907. The hotel attracted business from railroad workers and passengers, and it was home to a fine dining restaurant. The hotel operated until at least the 1930s, and later was converted into permanent residences. Hotel Meridian was listed as a contributing property to the Meridian Urban Center Historic District in 1979 and as a contributing property to the Meridian Downtown Historic District in 2007.

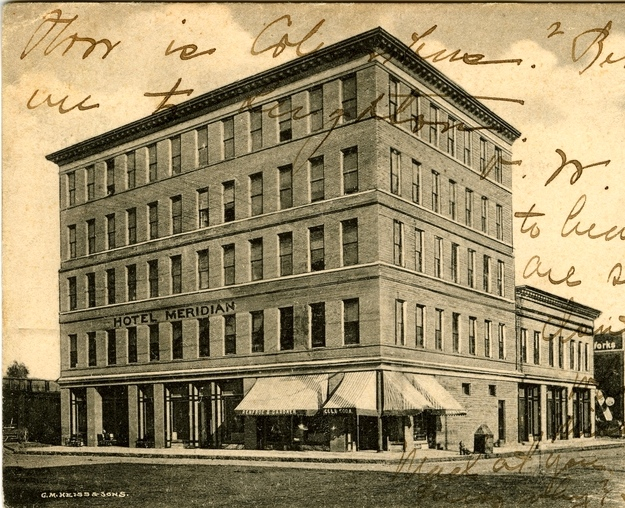
Hotel Meridian just after its construction in 1907

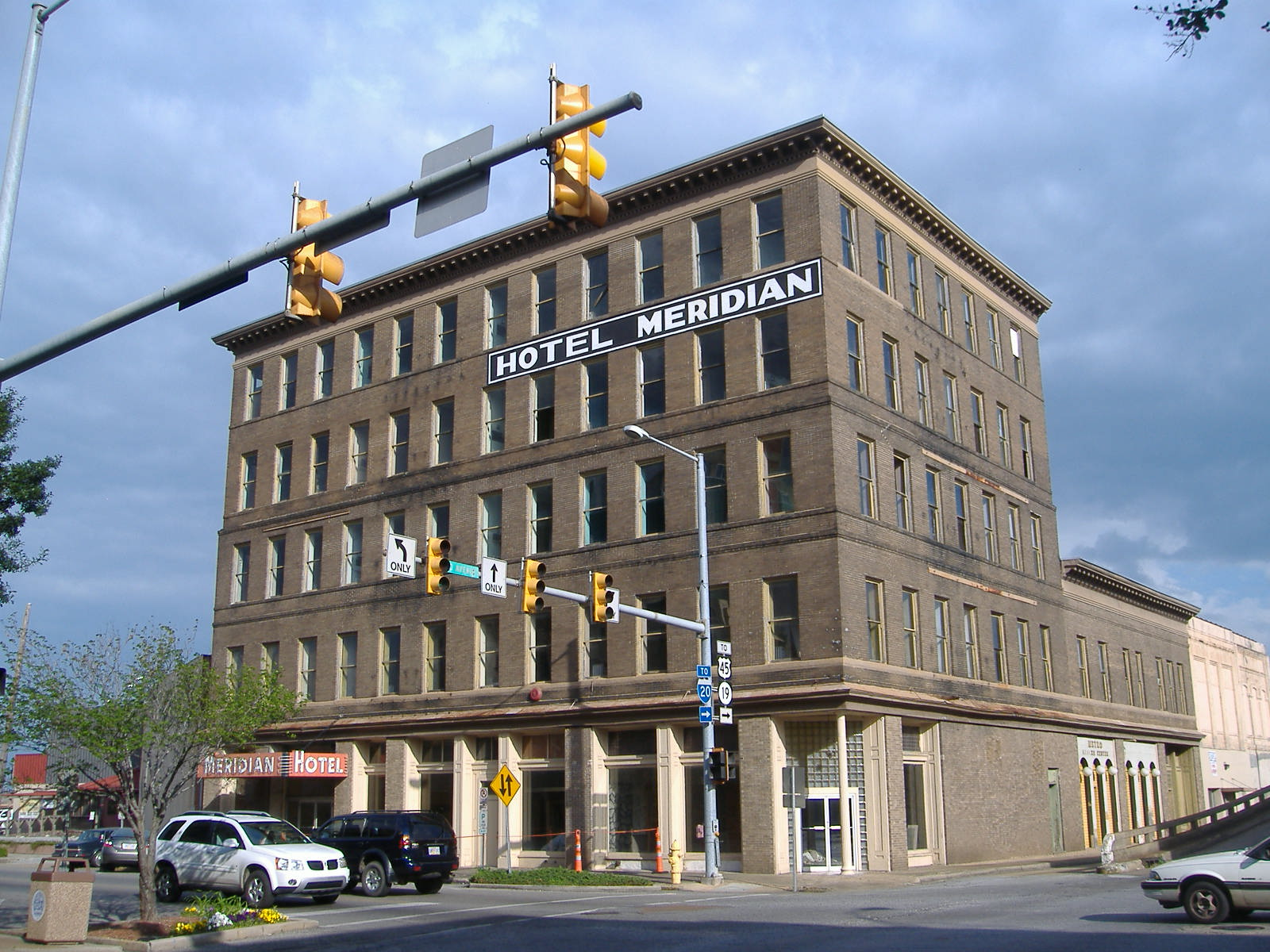
The hotel in 2008, long abandoned

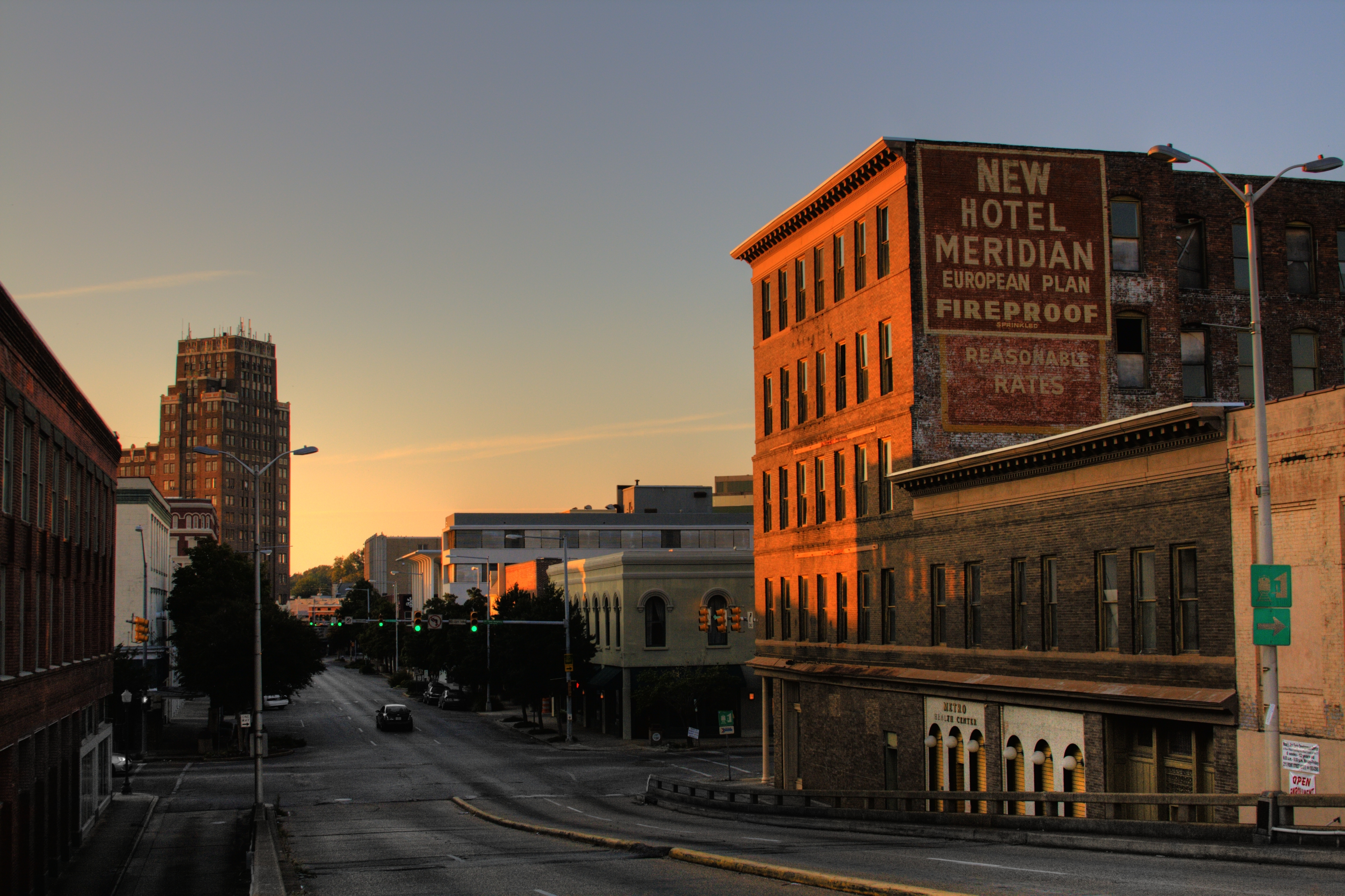
Downtown from 22nd Avenue Bridge, 2008

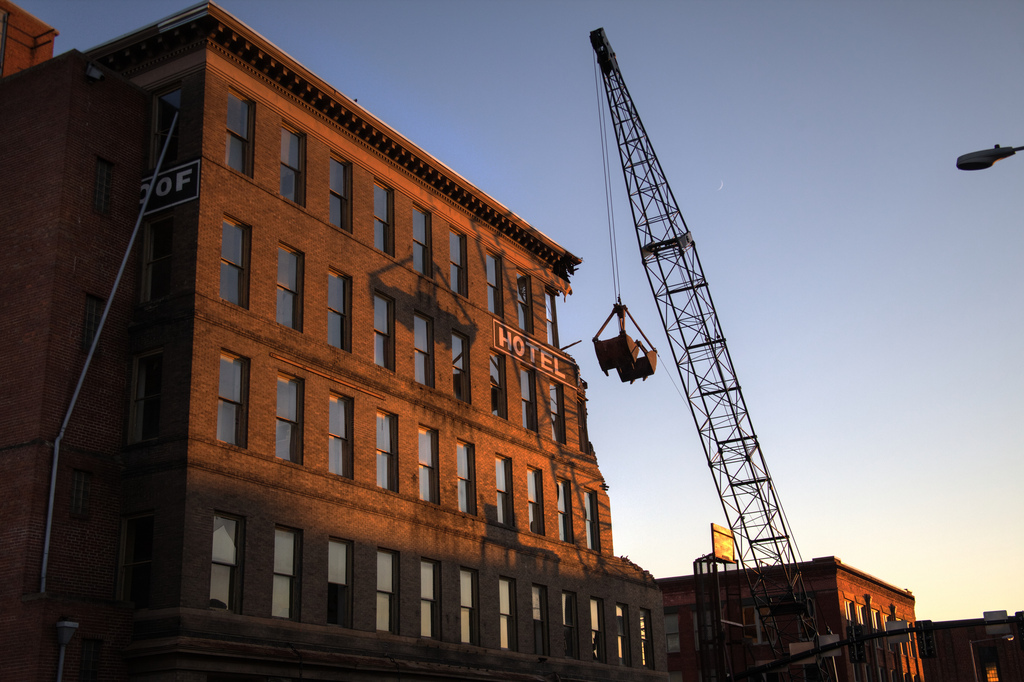
The hotel during demolition in 2011

The building sat vacant for decades. When the board of the proposed Mississippi Arts and Entertainment Center (MAEC) purchased the property next door to be used as a downtown museum, the owners donated this property for MAEC use. After the purchase, the MAEC released a statement that "due to the quality of the buildings and the function of them [...] we feel it's best to tear the buildings down." The building was demolished in late 2011. During the demolition, workers discovered several metal canisters full of crackers from the 1960s, evidence of a shelter dating from the Cuban Missile Crisis of 1962.

The site was vacant for more than three years. MAEC announced in early 2015 that the organization had raised over $19 million in private donations toward the center, as well as $25 million in state government funding. Ground was broken for construction on October 3, 2015, and construction of the MAEC is scheduled to be completed in November 2017.

=== Union Hotel ===
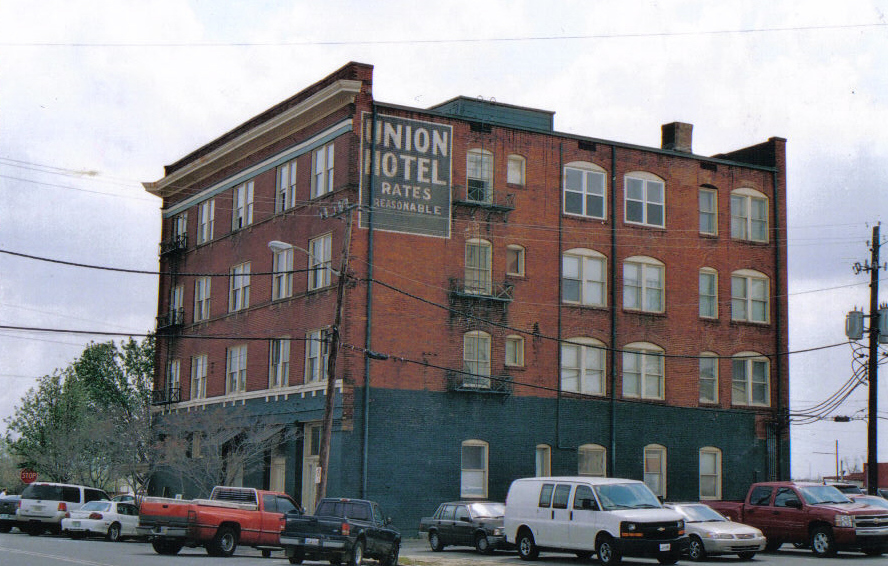
Union Hotel in 2008

The Union Hotel was built in 1908 to serve travelers to the city. The four-story building is located two blocks from Union Station and offered rooms to frequent rail travelers for only $2 per night, even as late as the 1960s. The original owner was P.C. Steele, but a group of bond holders took over control of the building in 1926. The hotel was leased for two years to C.W. Tucker from 1932 to 1934, but because of the onset of the Great Depression, he was unable to keep the hotel afloat.

A couple with the last name Williams took over the store in 1934 and operated a restaurant on the first floor, helping keep the business profitable. The Williamses left the property after World War II but re-acquired it in 1955; they operated the hotel until closing it on December 18, 1973.

In 1979 the building was individually listed on the National Register of Historic Places and also as a contributing property to the Meridian Depot Historic District. After being sold in 1981 by the Williams family, the hotel was later converted into downtown apartments. When the Depot Historic District was combined with the Urban Center Historic District as the Meridian Downtown Historic District in 2007, the hotel was listed as a contributing property to the latter.

== Further growth ==
Boosted by the railroad industry and related manufacturing, the economy of Meridian was in its "Golden Age" at the turn of the century. The population was around 15,000 in 1898, but by 1906 it had almost doubled to 28,000. Between 1890 and 1930, Meridian was the largest city in Mississippi and a leading center in the South for manufacturing. In 1907, around forty trains per day stopped in the city, providing passenger and freight service to a wide variety of destinations. The various railroad companies provided more than 6,000 jobs to city residents. By 1920 the number of trains per day increased to as many as one hundred.

=== Lamar Hotel ===
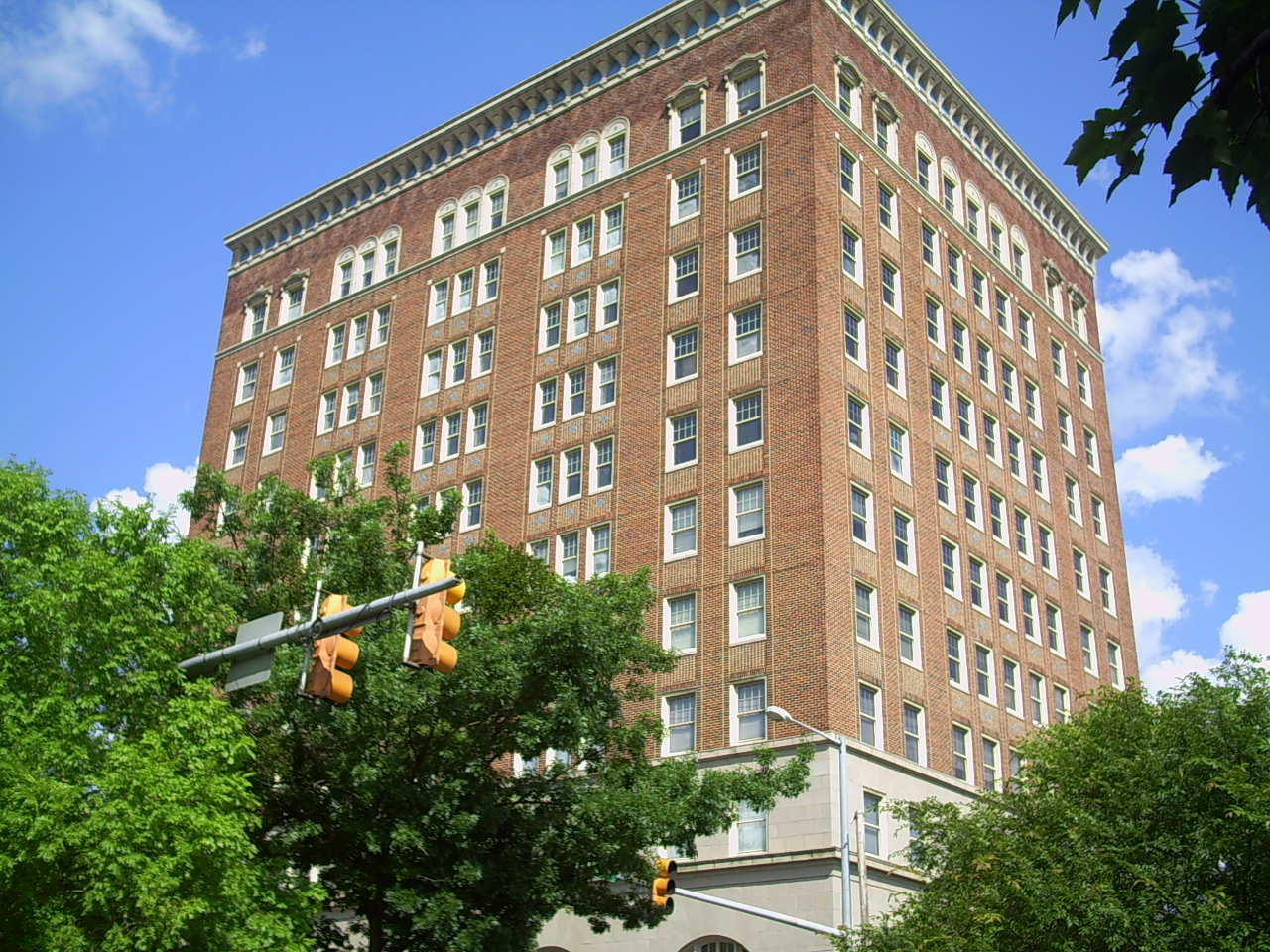
Lamar Hotel in 2010

Sam and Joe Meyer, who had previously been successful in the grocery business, became determined to build a hotel to express the grandeur of the growing city. In 1927 they built the eleven-story (then considered a skyscraper) Lamar Hotel, on the corner of 5th Street and 21st Avenue. The hotel was named after Lucius Quintus Cincinnatus Lamar II, a former U.S. Senator from Mississippi, cabinet member, and member of the Supreme Court.

When completed, the hotel had two grand openings–one for local and state officials, and a second for the general public. The hotel was supposed to be "the hotel" in Meridian, and at the beginning of its commission, it attracted business away from Hotel Meridian and the Union Hotel. With the drastic decline in business due to the Great Depression, it never reached its predicted splendor. The hotel was generally used by wealthier citizens and official visitors to the city; the general public rarely stayed in its rooms. For a short time, exhibits from the Meridian Art League were held in the hotel. These exhibits were eventually moved to the Meridian Museum of Art.

The hotel operated well into the 1950s, before being sold a number of times. By the later 20th century, rail passenger traffic was superseded by people traveling by automobile, and sometimes bypassing downtowns altogether when they stopped for the night. The building was eventually purchased by Lauderdale County in 1969 and converted for office use as the Raymond P. Davis County Annex Building.

The Lamar Hotel was listed on the National Register of Historic Places in 1979 and as a Mississippi Landmark in 1988. As it was not within the boundaries of either of the two smaller historic districts in downtown Meridian, the building was not listed as a contributing property to a historic district on the National Register until the larger Meridian Downtown Historic District was defined and listed in 2007. In 2011 the Mississippi Department of Archives and History (MDAH) issued a grant to the city to assess the building for possible restoration, stating the building had "significant repair and restoration needs."

=== E. F. Young Hotel ===
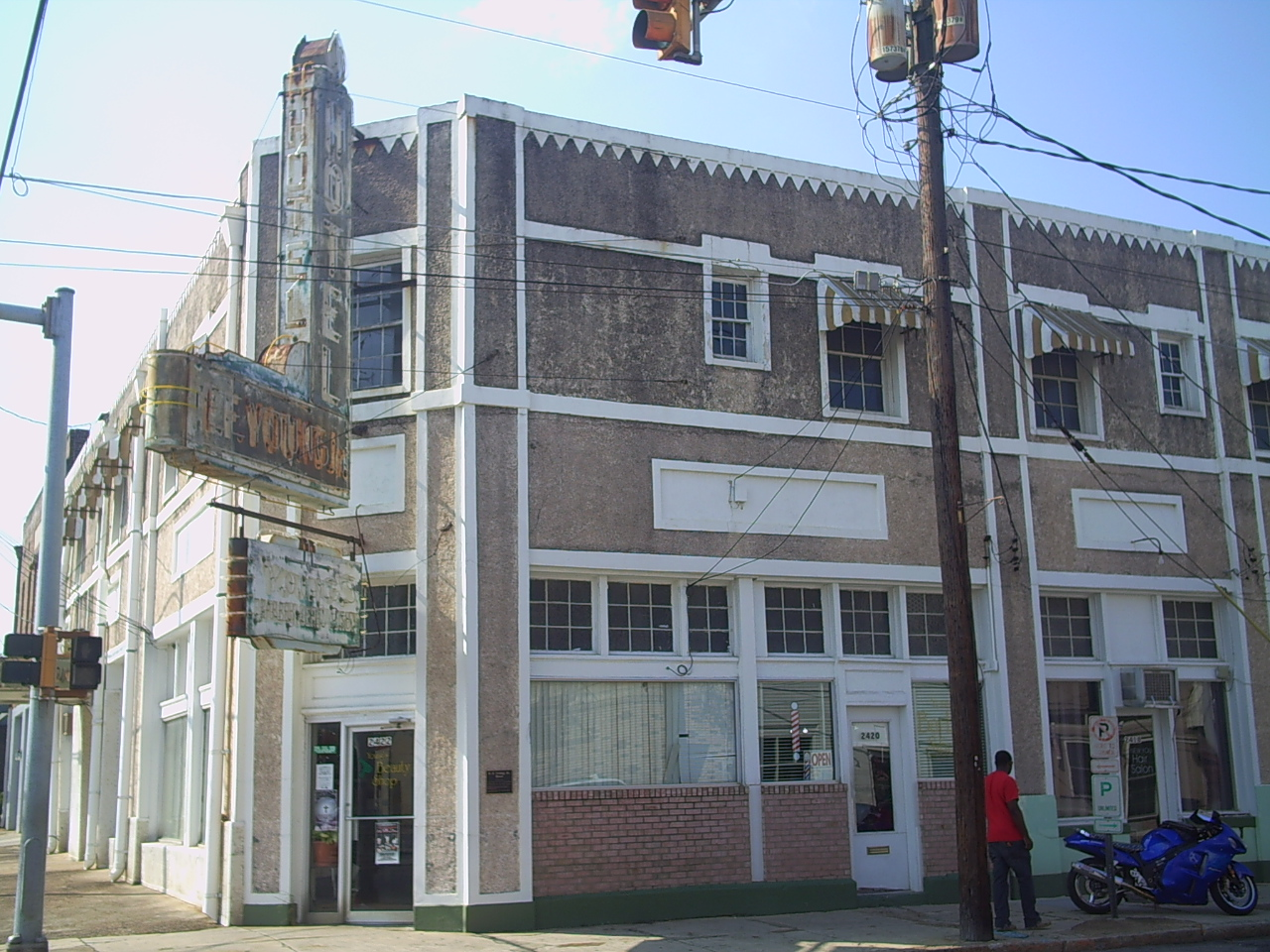
E. F. Young Hotel in 2010

As the city grew, African Americans developed a small business district slightly west of the city's core, around the intersection of 25th Avenue with 4th and 5th streets. Black travelers often visited this area when coming to the city, as they were prevented by racial segregation laws from using most other public facilities. Black-owned businesses included a hotel, two restaurants, and a movie theater.

Many businesses were started in this area, including one owned by E. F. Young, Jr., a local barber and taxi driver. Young opened a hotel and barber shop in 1931, and he also began selling hair care products made especially for African Americans. Some products he made himself. Eventually Young's operations included a beauty shop, two barber shops, a shoe shine parlor, and a manufacturing shop for the personal products.

While operating the barber shops out of the hotel, Young sold customers some hair care products he made in his own kitchen. Demand became so great that he opened a manufacturing company in 1933. The hotel also prospered, as it was one of the only hotels in the city to serve black travelers. The company did so well that by the end of World War II, Young's hair products were sold at locations around the state, including a pharmacy in Clarksdale and a barber shop in Cleveland. Later, he opened a second manufacturing site for his products in Chicago, a major destination in the 20th-century Great Migration for many African Americans from Mississippi.

After Young died in 1950, his wife Velma took over the business. In 1969 their son Charles became president. In 1985, Charles Young moved the business offices from the Young Hotel to a new building. By then he had expanded markets for the manufactured products to Canada and the Caribbean islands. In 2007, the Young Hotel was listed as a contributing property to the Meridian Downtown Historic District.

After much debate, the hotel was demolished on April 24, 2023 due to safety concerns.

== Development of historic assets and push for a new downtown hotel ==
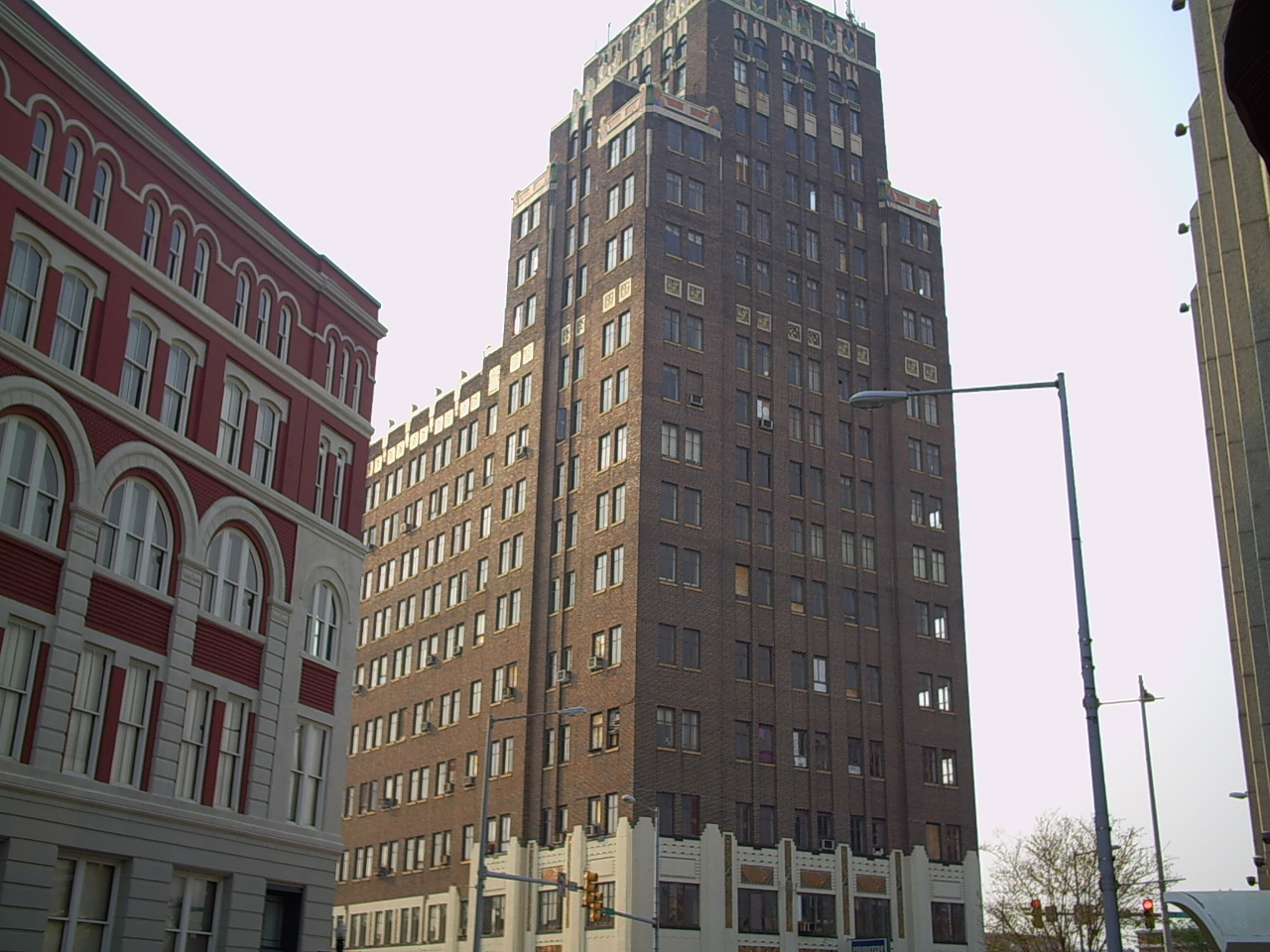
The Threefoot Building in 2009, awaiting renovation

Starting in the 1960s, residents began to move away from downtown in favor of new subdivisions north of the city's core. After strip commercial interests began to move downtown, the city worked to preserve its architectural legacy. It researched documentation to support designation of historic districts in the 1970s and 80s to preserve aspects of the city's history. The city established the Meridian Historic Districts and Landmarks Commission in 1979. The Meridian Main Street program was founded in 1985 to capitalize on the city's unique assets and sense of place.

Meridian Main Street organized several projects to revitalize downtown and worked with merchants on marketing and design. It was one of the parties supporting the reconstruction of Union Station in 1997 based on the original design of the 1906 train station, with a contemporary use as a multi-modal transportation center for the region. Other Main Street projects included the renovation of the Rosenbaum Building in 2001 and Weidmann's Restaurant in 2002. Meridian Main Street, along with The Riley Foundation, helped renovate the historic Grand Opera House in 2006, adapting it as the Mississippi State University Riley Center for Education and the Performing Arts. It is intended as a site of activities and events to enliven the city.

Just before the Riley Center was completed, the city announced that it had bought the Threefoot Building from a private developer. The expectation was that a Jackson renovation firm would convert the former office building into a luxury hotel. Staff at the Riley Center reacted positively, saying a downtown hotel would be a "wonderful thing for the city of Meridian." No Jackson renovator was found for the project. In 2009 the city entered into a partnership with Historic Renovation, Inc. (HRI) from New Orleans, which had completed a similar project in Jackson. Late that year the partnership was terminated by the newly elected mayor Cheri Barry. The city was required to pay HRI $1 million in reimbursement fees.

In this same period, local hotel owner Abdul Lala proposed constructing a new hotel for the downtown. Lala, who owns six hotels in the city, originally proposed the idea in 2008, before the city had partnered with HRI. While the Threefoot Building project, even with the partnership of HRI, would cost taxpayers millions of dollars, Lala offered to build a hotel at his own cost. Believing that the downtown cannot support two hotels, if the city renovates the Threefoot, he will not proceed with his project.

After the city terminated its partnership with HRI, it initiated an arrangement with Watkins Development to develop a plan to build a new hotel on the same block as the Threefoot. Plans released in June 2011 include renovating the Threefoot Building as a mixed-use commercial and residential development. Jason Goree, vice president of Watkins Development, has said, "The Riley Center needs a convention center hotel. (Downtown Meridian) needs a convention center hotel." Former mayor John Robert Smith, Lauderdale County Tourism Director Suzy Johnson, and Lala's partner Dede Mogollon agree.

In September 2015 a deal was approved by the Meridian City Council, which sold the Threefoot to a Buford, Georgia-based hotel management company named Ascent Hospitality Management. The building was purchased "as-is" for $10,000 cash, and Ascent agreed to begin construction within 12 months of the date of purchase on a "Courtyard by Marriott" hotel with 120 guest rooms. Construction is scheduled to take approximately 14 to 18 months, with the company committing to spending at least $14 million on the project. John Tampa, head of Ascent Hospitality Management, has set a goal for the opening of the renovated building to coincide with the opening of the Mississippi Arts and Entertainment Center at the site of the old Hotel Meridian in November 2017.
