= Threefoot Building =

- U.S. National Register of Historic Places
- Mississippi Landmark
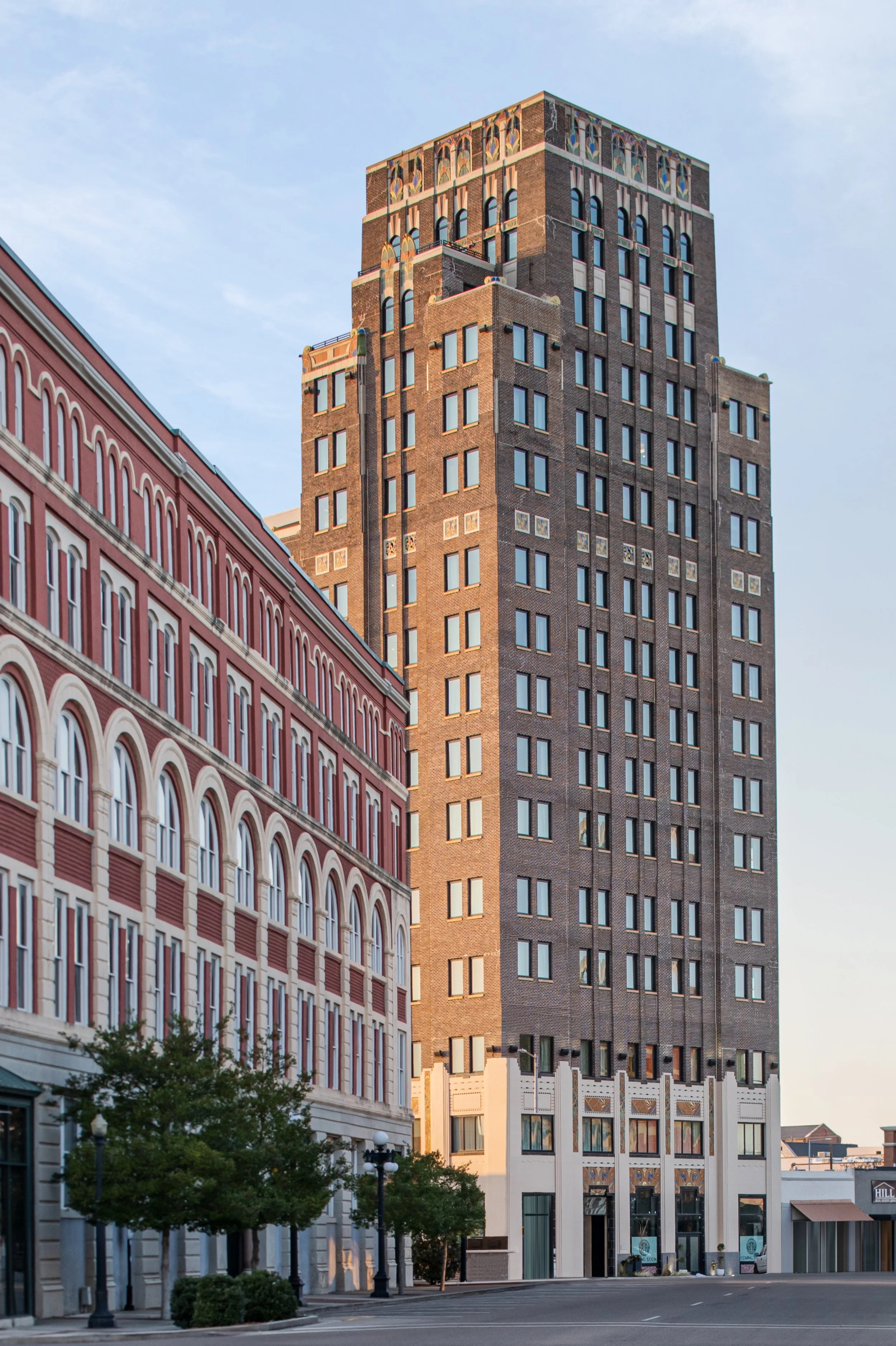
- Threefoot Building in 2021

- Location within Mississippi Location within the United States
- Location: Meridian, Mississippi
- Coordinates: 32°21′52″N 88°42′2″W
- Built: 1929
- Architect: Claude H. Lindsley, principal architect; Frank Fort, associate architect; Threefoot Realty Co.
- Architectural style: Art Deco
- MPS: Meridian MRA
- NRHP reference No.: 79003408
- USMS No.: 075-MER-0146.2-NR-ML

Significant dates
- Added to NRHP: December 18, 1979
- Designated USMS: July 10, 2008

The Threefoot Building (sometimes referred to as simply "The Threefoot") is a historic office building located in downtown Meridian, Mississippi named after the Threefoot family who owned and operated a business in downtown Meridian during the late 19th century and early 20th century. Designed by Claude H. Lindsley and completed in 1929 in the Art Deco style, the 16-story building is still the tallest in the city. It was added to the National Register of Historic Places on December 18, 1979, under the Meridian Multiple Property Submission of buildings contributing to the historic nature of the city's downtown. In 2008 the Threefoot was recognized by the state as a Mississippi Landmark.

Despite the completion of the building preceding the onset of the Great Depression, leading to the bankruptcy of the Threefoot family, the building was occupied by many different tenants until the 1990s, by which time suburban development had drawn off most of them in favor of peripheral locations. Hoping to attract new tenants to the building and the rest of downtown, in 2002 the city started the annual Threefoot Arts Festival, naming it after the building. After attracting some interest in the mid-2000s, the city's plans for redevelopment foundered with changes in city administration in 2009, resulting in the National Trust for Historic Preservation listing the building in 2010 in its annual group of "America's Most Endangered Places." In 2015 after extensive efforts by a newer administration, an agreement was reached in which the building was sold to a private developer. As of 2024, it is the Threefoot Hotel, operated by Marriott as part of its Tribute Portfolio hotels.

== History ==
The 16-story brick structure was developed by and named for the Threefoot family, German-Jewish immigrants who arrived in the mid-19th century and anglicized their name from Dreyfuss ("three foot" in German) to join their new American home. Abraham Threefoot began to make a name for the family in the late 1860s. He owned a grocery store on 25th Avenue in mid-1870. It may have been his grocery that was located at the corner of 4th Street and 25th Avenue on the ground floor of what was known as the Grand Opera House. The grocery moved at least once to a different location on the same street in 1884, but sources are unclear if it had three sites or two. The grocery was taken over by Abraham's sons–H. Marshall, Kutcher, and Lewis, collectively known as the "Threefoot Brothers"–after his death.

By 1910, sales at Threefoot and Sons exceeded $100,000 per year. When the YMCA building was being constructed, the builders ran into financial trouble, but the Threefoot Brothers donated $35,000 to the project, allowing construction to continue. Just before the beginning of the Great Depression, the company built the Threefoot Building in downtown Meridian on 22nd Avenue adjacent to the Marks-Rothenberg Department Store and the Grand Opera House. It was the tallest building in the city and admired as a symbol of the city's growth. The office building was finished in 1929, shortly before the stock market crash. A combination of shaky finances and the onset of the Great Depression caused the family's business to cease operation.

The building operated as an office building under different ownership for several decades. Demographic changes followed suburban development, stimulated by highway construction. After Meridian's first suburban mall was built in the 1970s, continued development outside the city drew off tenants and other businesses. By the 1990s, the Threefoot Building had been mostly abandoned.

== Threefoot Festival ==
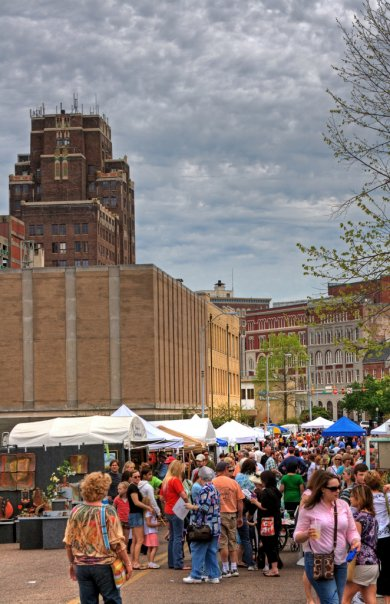
Threefoot Festival 2009

In an effort to attract interest from a private developer to reoccupy and renovate the building, the city started to hold an annual showcase of art by local artists in 2002, naming it the "Threefoot Arts Festival" in honor of the historic building's status as an icon of downtown and indirectly the Threefoot family, who had contributed much to the city. The festival was held annually in October at Dumont Plaza, located two blocks from the building, and on 4th and 5th streets between 22nd and 23rd avenues.

Along with art exhibitions from state and regional artists, the festival also featured a variety of live music and entertainment throughout the day, as well as food and beverages sold by local companies and organizations. Retail stores and businesses throughout the city helped to promote the festival by offering special deals and discounts to members of the festival. Admission was free, so an accurate count of attendees is difficult to achieve, but annual turnout is estimated to have been several thousand people.

In 2009 the festival was combined with the Arts in the Park Festival, previously held in early April at Bonita Lakes (and earlier at Highland Park), to create the Threefoot Festival.

Since 2011 the festival has been held on the first weekend of April on 7th Street between 23rd and 25th avenues and on the lawn in front of Meridian City Hall. It includes art contests for children in grade school (hosted at the Meridian Museum of Art), access for children to try out musical instruments provided by the Meridian Symphony Orchestra, performances by local bands, and stands promoting local restaurants.

== Preservation efforts ==
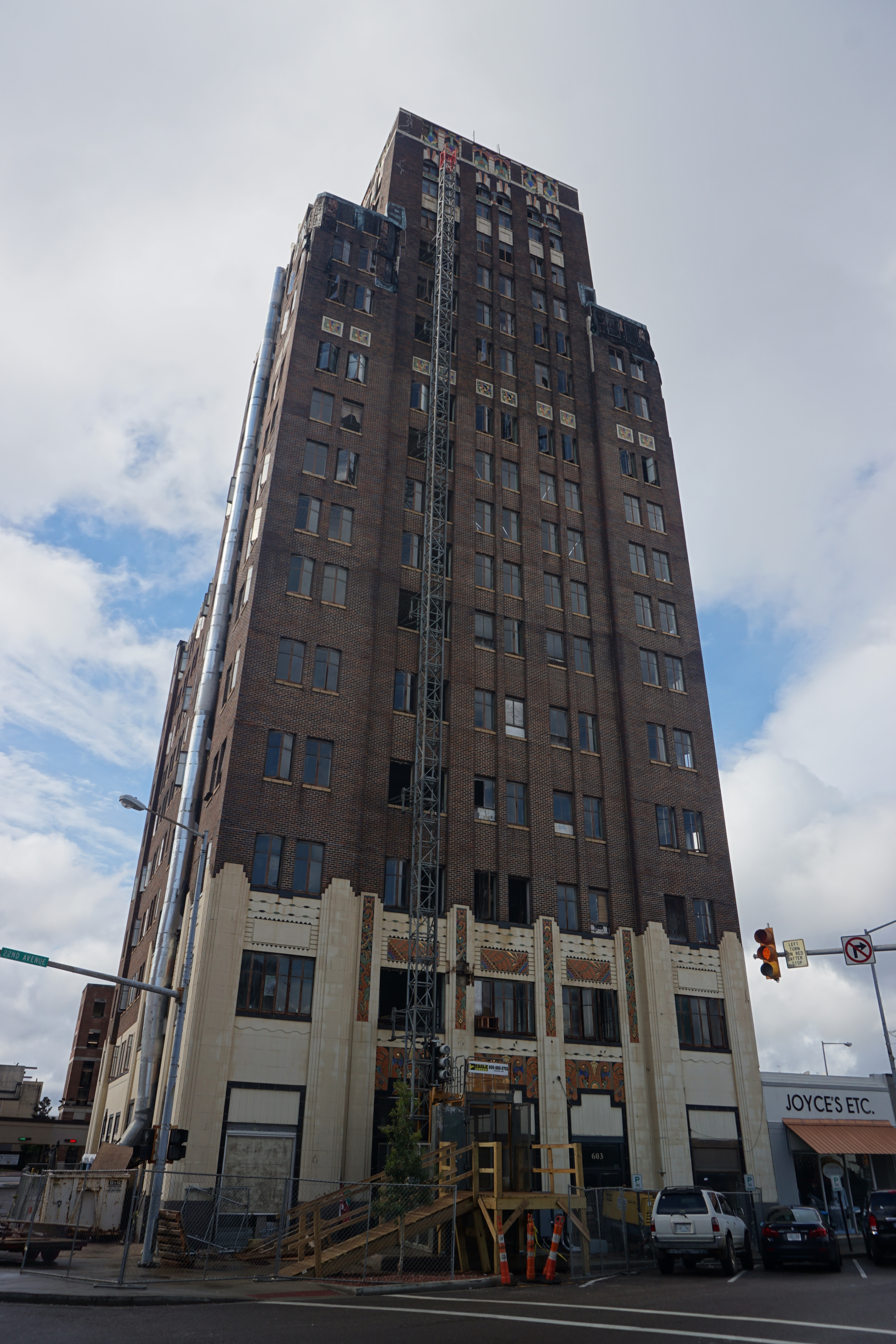
Threefoot Building in 2018

=== Historic Restoration Inc. ===
In August 2006, the city purchased the building from Alabama developer Howard Robbins for $1.2 million, with the expectation that it would be renovated by a developer from Jackson, but the city could not immediately attract regional interest. Historic Restoration Inc. (HRI), a New Orleans developer known for restoring the King Edward Hotel in Jackson, eventually showed interest in the project in 2008, proposing that the building be transformed into a 120-room Courtyard by Marriott hotel. The renovation would have cost $55 million, and the city would have backed $14 million of it. After much debate, HRI reached an agreement in January 2009 with mayor John Robert Smith and the city council.

In July 2009 newly elected Mayor Cheri Barry took office and worked to undo the agreement. Stating that she saw problems in the plan, she asked Mississippi Heritage Trust Director David Preziosi if it was possible to remove the building from the National Register of Historic Places in order to make it easier to demolish. Preziosi advised Barry against having the property delisted and offered her names of people to talk to about funding options for the building. The Meridian Star reported in June 2010 that the mayor's office had still not contacted the people suggested to Barry. At the same time, HRI was asking the city to help complete funding of the project by acquiring grants from the state. Barry, however, refused to ask the state, claiming that the economy was too stressed to ask for money that wasn't essential to the city's function.

After a long controversy, HRI's agreement with the city was terminated in late 2009 due to lack of support from Barry and the need for various drainage repairs. Because the city had terminated the agreement, it was required to reimburse HRI for the $1 million already put into the project. In a prepared statement, Barry claimed that the city and HRI would "look down the road for future projects and possibly even resume the Threefoot Project under different circumstances and different finances."

=== Further efforts ===
After the deal with HRI was terminated, the National Trust for Historic Preservation included the building on its annual list of America's Most Endangered Historic Places in June 2010. In October 2010, the city accepted a grant from the Mississippi Department of Archives and History (MDAH) for a study of the building. The study was to focus on what would have to be done to rehabilitate the building for use. The city also hired Watkins Development, at a cost of $10,000 per month, to focus on developing not only the Threefoot Building but the rest of downtown and all of Meridian. Watkins Development – like HRI – was involved in the renovation of Jackson's King Edward Hotel. The building assessment study was completed in mid-2012, finding that the foundation of the building was sound, but the upper floors were being subjected to daily weather because of blown out windows, crumbling bricks, and other structural problems.

Seeing the lack of developer interest, a local group of private citizens, identifying as the Threefoot Preservation Society, formed in early June 2013 to discuss a future for the building. Since 2013, the Threefoot Preservation Society has held weekly cleanups of the building, even attracting descendants of the Threefoot family to help out on occasion. The group hosted an event celebrating the 84th anniversary of the building's opening in April 2014, where for the first time in years, the city opened the first floor of Threefoot Building to the public. Dr. Henry Threefoot and his family, descendants of the original Threefoot family, were invited to join in the festivities. Another celebration was held in April 2015 for the 85th anniversary, and mayor Percy Bland was in attendance to show support for the society's endeavors.

=== Ascent Hospitality Management ===
In September 2015 a deal was approved by the Meridian City Council which sold the building to a Buford, Georgia-based hotel management company named Ascent Hospitality Management. The building was purchased "as-is" for $10,000 cash, and Ascent agreed to begin construction within 12 months of the date of purchase on a Courtyard by Marriott hotel with 120 guest rooms. Construction is scheduled to take approximately 14 to 18 months, with the company committing to spending at least $14 million on the project. John Tampa, head of Ascent Hospitality Management, has set a goal for the opening of the renovated building to coincide with the opening of the Mississippi Arts and Entertainment Center at the site of the old Hotel Meridian in November 2017. Although intensive preservation, reconstruction, and refurbishment efforts as well as projected opening dates have been delayed over the last few years, John Campo, the chief architect of its reconstruction, who has stated "Meridian is a target-rich environment for adaptive reuse of historic buildings", has also stated as recently as June 2020 that the building could be re-opened as early as November 2020.
