= Carnegie Branch Library (Meridian, Mississippi) =

- U.S. National Register of Historic Places
- Location within Mississippi Location within the United States
- Location: 2721 13th St., Meridian, Mississippi
- Coordinates: 32°22′10″N 88°42′23″W
- Built: 1913
- MPS: Meridian MRA
- NRHP reference No.: 79003385
- Added to NRHP: December 18, 1979

The Carnegie Branch Library at 13th St and 28th Ave in Meridian, Mississippi is one of two former Carnegie libraries in the city, both funded by a grant from Andrew Carnegie in 1904. This library was built for blacks while the other was built for whites. The other library was built at 25th Ave and 7th St and now houses the Meridian Museum of Art. Both buildings were listed on the National Register of Historic Places in 1979. The black library was demolished in 2008.

== History ==
A group of women in the city had formed the Fortnightly Book and Magazine Club in the 1880s and began raising money to build a library for the city. The books they collected and shared within the club were later the basis of the library collection for Meridian. With wide support for the library, the club enlisted Israel Marks, a city leader, to approach the philanthropist Andrew Carnegie for funding assistance. Marks, who helped operate the Marks-Rothenberg Department Store next door to the Grand Opera House, was an acquaintance of Carnegie and convinced him to issue a $38,000 grant in 1904 to the city's government to build two Carnegie libraries — one for whites and one for African Americans. The white library would receive $30,000 while the African American one would receive $8,000.

It was asserted to be the only Carnegie library ever built for African Americans in the country, however twelve total Colored Carnegie Libraries were built. The 1905-built Louisville Free Public Library, Western Colored Branch was the first (Louisville would also get another, the Eastern Branch), and the rest were in Mounds Bayou, MS (opened 1910); Houston, TX; Savannah, GA; Evansville, IL; New Orleans, LA; Nashville, TN; Knoxville, TN; Atlanta, GA; and Greensboro, NC.

The city used the money both to renovate the vacant building (formerly owned by the First Presbyterian Church of Meridian) at 25th Ave and 7th St and transform it into the white library and to build the African American library at 13th St and 28th Ave on land donated by a local Methodist church.

The two libraries served the city until 1967, when the institutions became integrated, combined their collections, and moved all materials to the new Meridian Public Library at 2517 7th St. The former white library was renovated and converted into the Meridian Museum of Art in 1970. The former African American library was demolished on May 28, 2008.
