= Meridian Museum of Art =

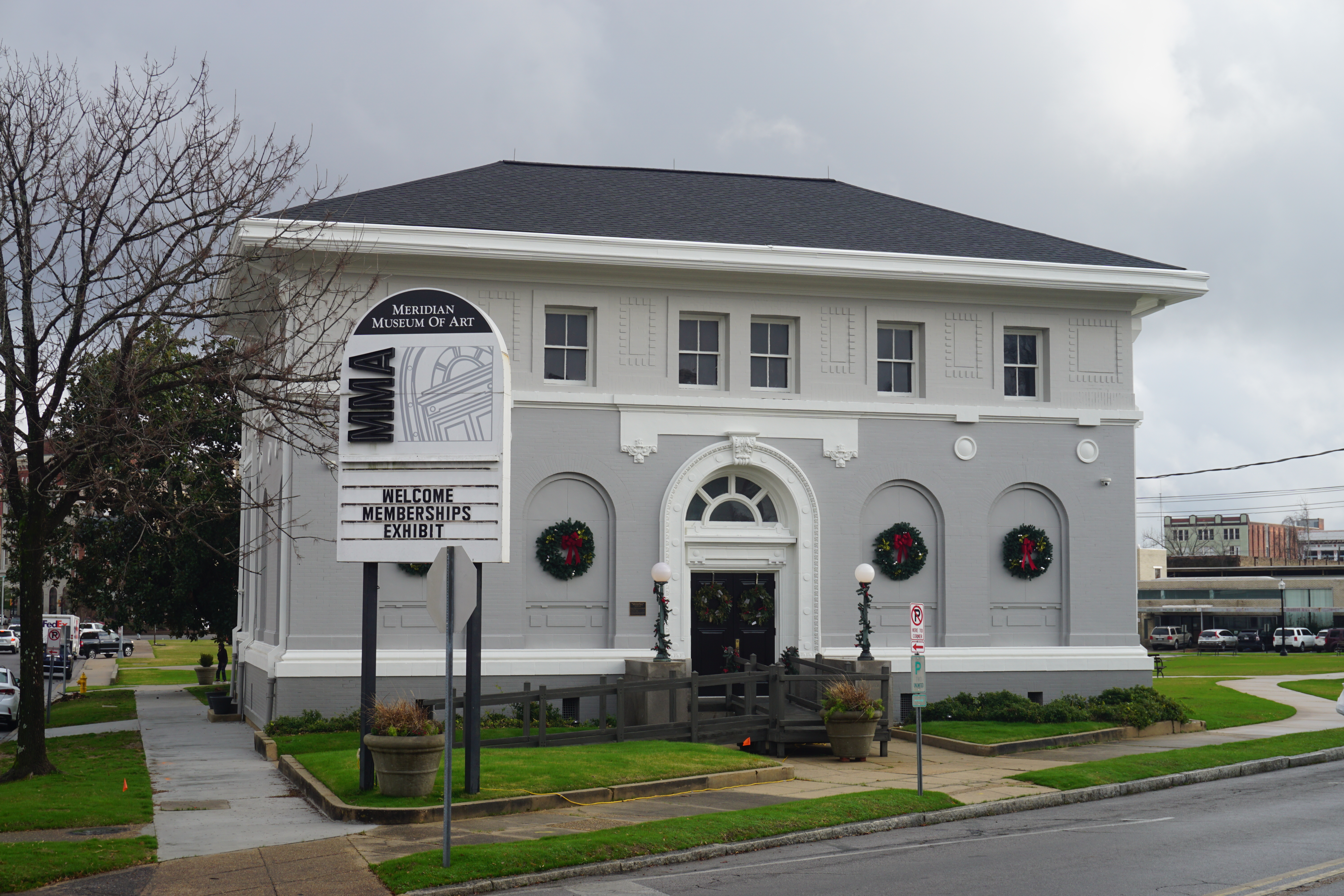
- Meridian Museum of Art in 2018
- Established: 1970
- Location: 628 25th Avenue; Meridian, Mississippi
- Coordinates: 32°21′50.1″N 88°42′11.2″W
- Type: Art museum
- Director: Kate Cherry
- Website: www.meridianmuseum.org

- Meridian Museum of Art
- U.S. National Register of Historic Places
- Mississippi Landmark
- Location within Mississippi
- Location: Meridian, Mississippi
- Built: February 1884
- Architectural style: Italianate
- MPS: Meridian MRA
- NRHP reference No.: 79003397
- USMS No.: 075-MER-0151-NR-ML

Significant dates
- Added to NRHP: December 18, 1979
- Designated USMS: January 8, 1985

Meridian Museum of Art is an art museum located at 628 25th Avenue, Meridian, Mississippi. The building was added to the National Register of Historic Places in 1979 and declared a Mississippi Landmark in 1985. The building originally served as the home of the First Presbyterian Church of Meridian until the city of Meridian bought the building in 1911 and turned it into a Carnegie Library in 1913. The city originally constructed two Carnegie libraries — one for whites and one for African-Americans; the building currently housing the Meridian Museum of Art served as the white library. In 1970, after the libraries integrated and moved to a new location, the vacant building at 628 25th Avenue was transformed into the Meridian Museum of Art and still operates today.

== First Presbyterian Church of Meridian ==
The lot on which the building resides was originally owned by Richard McLemore, the first settler in the Meridian area in 1831. When construction of the Mobile and Ohio Railroad began in the area, most of McLemore's land was bought by Lewis A. Ragsdale, including the lot at 25th Ave and 7th St on which the museum now stands. In 1867 Ragsdale donated the lot to members of the First Presbyterian Church of Meridian, and they built a small wooden structure in which to hold worship services. A fire on January 24, 1883, burned the building to the ground, but it was later rebuilt in the same location with brick by members of the church. On September 25, 1911, the church sold the building to the city of Meridian.

== Carnegie Library ==
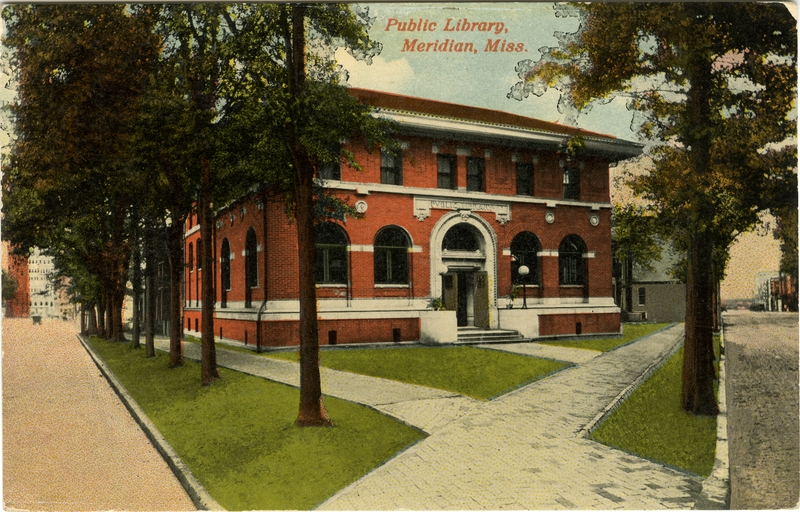
Postcard of the museum when it was one of Meridian's Carnegie public libraries

Israel Marks, who helped operate the Marks-Rothenberg Department Store next door to the Grand Opera House, was an acquaintance of philanthropist Andrew Carnegie from Pittsburgh, Pennsylvania. In 1904, after being asked by citizens of Meridian, Marks approached Carnegie about funding for a library in the city. Marks convinced Carnegie to issue a $38,000 grant to the city's government to build two Carnegie libraries — one for whites and one for African-Americans. The city used the money both to renovate the vacant building (formerly owned by First Presbyterian Church of Meridian) at 25th Ave and 7th St and transform it into a library, and to build another library for African-Americans at 13th St and 28th Ave on land donated by a local Methodist church. The two libraries served the city until 1967, when the institutions became integrated, combined their collections, and moved all materials to the new Meridian Public Library at 2517 7th St. The 13th street library is also listed on the National Register as Carnegie Branch Library.

== Art museum ==
One of the first art organizations in the city, The Meridian Art League, was established in February 1933. From 1933 to 1949, art exhibitions were held in Lamar Hotel in downtown Meridian. In 1949, The Meridian Art League changed its name to Meridian Art Association and began to hold exhibitions on the second floor of the Marks-Rothenberg Department Store. For the next 20 years, exhibits were held at various locations throughout the city, including the Meridian Public Library, the Strand Theatre, Alex Loeb Department Store, First National Bank, Merchants and Farmers Bank, Sears, the Broadmoor Shopping Center, and Weidmann's Restaurant.

After the Carnegie library at 25th Ave and 7th street was closed and the operations moved to the new public library, the Meridian Art Association began talks with the city of transforming the vacant building into an art museum. This would give the association a permanent home for its exhibits. In December 1968, the Meridian Art Association raised $10,000 to start the museum; after many hours of effort, the grand opening was scheduled for January 1970. A fire on December 22, 1969, postponed the opening because some of the building had to be reconstructed.

== Today ==
The building opened as the Meridian Museum of Art in late 1970 and has since served as the region's premiere public museum. It features rotating exhibitions as well as many educational programs for both students and adults. The museum offers more free programming than any other museum in the state and holds over 30 exhibitions annually, ranging from traditional decorative arts to ethnographic and tribal materials, photography, crafts, and many other works of art. The collection also includes 18th and 19th century portraits, 20th century photography, and several sculptures.

Along with the exhibits, the museum offers special classes and programs to encourage participation by Meridian Community College, as well as city and county schools in Lauderdale County and the entire two-state area.

The museum primarily serves audiences from Meridian and Lauderdale County and the surrounding counties: Kemper, Neshoba, Newton, Jasper, and Clarke (in Mississippi), and Sumter and Choctaw (in Alabama).
