= Weidmann's Restaurant =

- U.S. Historic district – Contributing property
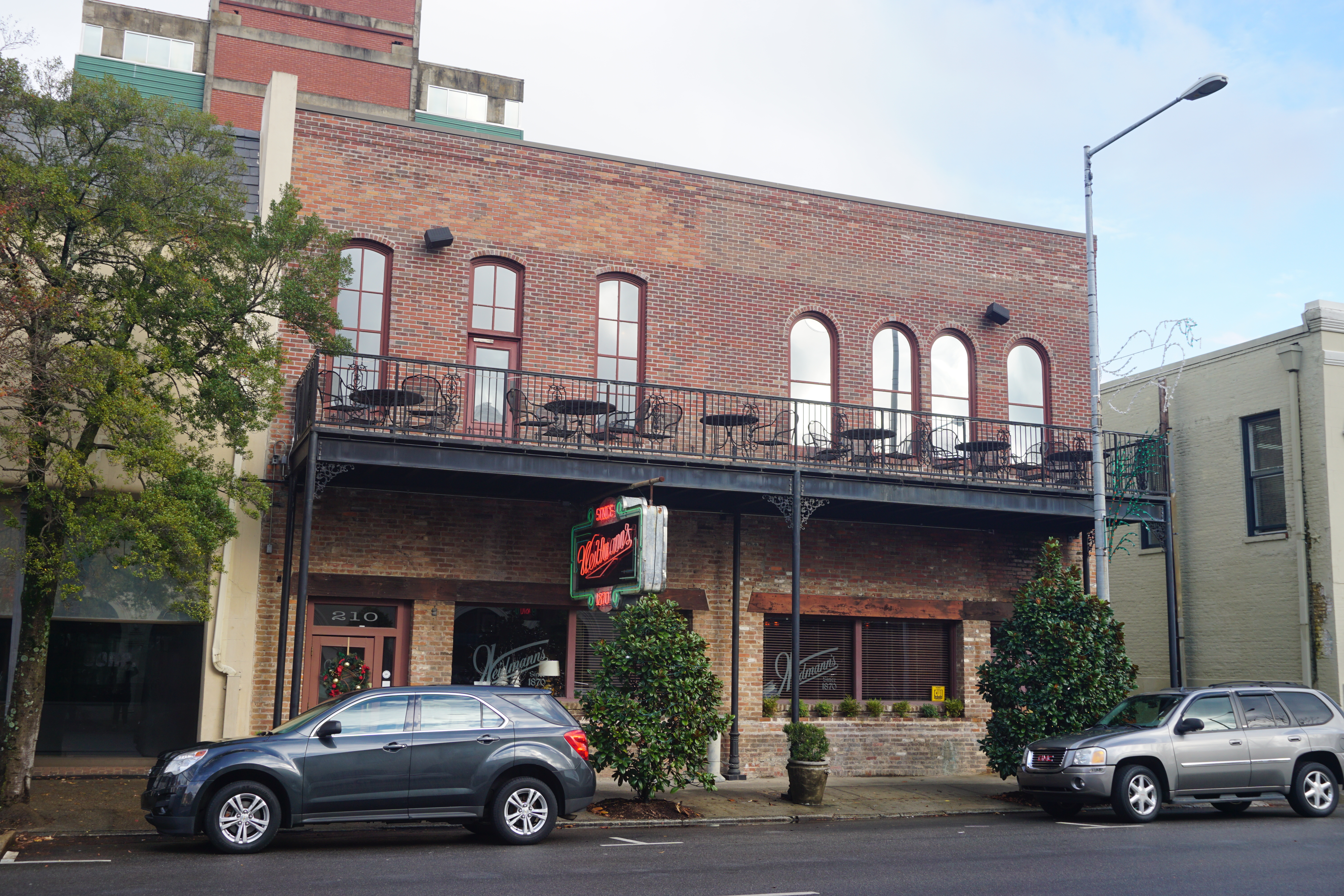
- Weidmann's in 2018

- Location within Mississippi
- Location: 108-210 22nd Ave, Meridian, Mississippi
- Coordinates: 32.363020°N 88.699006°W
- Built: 1870
- Part of: Meridian Downtown Historic District (ID06001249)
- Designated CP: December 18, 1979

Weidmann's Restaurant is a historic restaurant in Meridian, Mississippi, United States, established in 1870. It was originally listed as a contributing property to the Meridian Urban Center Historic District, listed on the National Register of Historic Places in 1979. The Urban Center Historic District was combined with the Meridian Depot Historic District in 2005 to become the Meridian Downtown Historic District.

== History ==
Weidmann's was opened in 1870 by Felix Weidmann, an immigrant from Zurich, Switzerland. Previously an ocean liner chef, Weidmann began the establishment as a restaurant-hotel called the European House. Weidmann was later involved in the hotel business, establishing the International Hotel on the corner of 22nd Avenue and Front Street in 1884. After Felix Weidmann's death in 1885, his son, Phillip Weidmann, took over the restaurant. Phillip moved the restaurant to a location at the intersection of 24th Avenue and 5th Street and renamed it "Taft and Weidmann's". During World War I, the restaurant was moved to Hattiesburg, Mississippi, for two years in order to better serve soldiers at Camp Shelby. The restaurant would also occupy a location on 5th Street before moving to its current (and original) location on 22nd Avenue in 1923. Henry Weidmann, Phillip's son, took over the establishment after Phillip's death in 1927.

In 1935 the celebration for Fred and Al Key's record-breaking endurance flight, which lasted 653 hours and 34 minutes and wasn't broken until 1973 by astronauts, was held at Weidmann's. Shorty McWilliams, husband of Gloria Weidmann, owned the store in 1955. Gloria Chancellor and her husband, great-great grandchildren of the founders, assumed ownership of the restaurant in 1989. Weidmann's would remain owned by someone in the Weidmann family until the 1990s.

The restaurant, which is the oldest in the state of Mississippi, became one of the most well-known restaurants in the state as well, famous for its black bottom pie, peanut butter crocks, and numerous pictures hanging on the walls. The restaurant's lunch counter has been in place since the business opened, and a "treasure chest" is filled with candy and other goodies given to reward children with good manners.

== Renovations and ownership change ==
In 2001 Southern Cast Products, a manufacturing company in Meridian, bought the restaurant. Weidmann's closed later that year and underwent a $20 million renovation. The downstairs entrance was moved from the southwest corner to the northwest, and two banquet rooms were added on the second floor. After the renovation, the lease was held by Nick Apostle, owner of Nick's Restaurant in Jackson, Mississippi. He operated the store until 2004 when he decided to devote his full attention to the Jackson restaurant, after which general manager Willie McGehee and others in Meridian assumed full operational control.

With the onset of the Late-2000s recession, the restaurant experienced a downturn. Nearly half of the restaurant's business came from large parties of workers from local hospitals and pharmaceutical companies. As part of the recession, though, many of these companies stopped paying for these dinners, so the workers were no longer able to eat there. In an attempt to garner support for the restaurant and to keep it from failing, the Alliance for Downtown Meridian urged people to eat there at least once a week.

Despite the Alliance's efforts, the restaurant closed its doors on April 17, 2010. In early June of the same year, Charles Frazier, manager of Crescent City Grill, bought the lease to the building. Frazier said he planned to recreate the restaurant's past by reintroducing much of the classic Weidmann's menu after it had been replaced by more expensive fine dining during the previous renovation and ownership change. Frazier reopened the restaurant in late July after adding hardwood floors and bringing back the lunch counter by knocking out the back wall. Two former employees were also rehired to give the restaurant a feeling more reminiscent of the past.
