= National Register of Historic Places listings in Lauderdale County, Mississippi =

Location of Lauderdale County in Mississippi

This is a list of the National Register of Historic Places listings in Lauderdale County, Mississippi.

This is intended to be a complete list of the properties and districts on the National Register of Historic Places in Lauderdale County, Mississippi, United States. Latitude and longitude coordinates are provided for many National Register properties and districts; these locations may be seen together in a map.

There are 46 properties and districts listed on the National Register in the county. Another 7 properties were once listed but have been removed.

This National Park Service list is complete through NPS recent listings posted October 23, 2026.

== Current listings ==
	Name on the Register	Image	Date listed	Location	City or town	Description
1	Beth Israel Cemetery	Beth Israel Cemetery	March 22, 1989 (#89000169)	19th St. and 5th Ave. 32°22′38″N 88°40′57″W	Meridian	A cemetery dating from 1870
2	Cahn-Crawford House	Cahn-Crawford House	December 18, 1979 (#79003384)	1200 22nd Ave. 32°22′07″N 88°42′01″W	Meridian	
3	Carnegie Branch Library		December 18, 1979 (#79003385)	2721 13th St. 32°22′10″N 88°42′23″W	Meridian	Built for Blacks in a segregated library system; demolished in 2008.
4	Causeyville Historic District	Causeyville Historic District	January 2, 1986 (#86000058)	Meridian-Causeyville Rd. 32°15′30″N 88°33′46″W	Causeyville	
5	Coosha	Coosha	November 21, 1978 (#78001608)	Address restricted	Lizelia	
6	Dabney-Green House	Dabney-Green House	December 18, 1979 (#79003386)	1017 22nd Ave. 32°22′03″N 88°42′02″W	Meridian	
7	Dement Printing Company	Dement Printing Company	December 18, 1979 (#79003387)	2002 6th St. 32°21′55″N 88°41′57″W	Meridian	
8	East End Historic District	East End Historic District	August 21, 1987 (#87000470)	Roughly bounded by 18th St., 11th Ave., 14th St., 14th Ave., 5th St., and 17th Ave. 32°22′20″N 88°41′28″W	Meridian	
9	Elson-Dudley House	Elson-Dudley House	December 18, 1979 (#79003390)	1101 29th Ave. 32°22′04″N 88°42′27″W	Meridian	
10	First Presbyterian Church of Meridian	First Presbyterian Church of Meridian	December 18, 1979 (#79003391)	911 23rd Ave. 32°21′59″N 88°42′06″W	Meridian	
11	Grand Opera House	Grand Opera House	December 27, 1972 (#72000696)	2208 5th St. 32°22′21″N 88°42′02″W	Meridian	
12	Highland Park	Highland Park	February 28, 1979 (#79001325)	Roughly bounded by 15th and 19th Sts., 37th and 47th Aves. 32°22′28″N 88°43′04″W	Meridian	
13	Highland Park Dentzel Carousel and Shelter Building	Highland Park Dentzel Carousel and Shelter Building	February 27, 1987 (#87000863)	Highland Park; 32°22′34″N 88°43′05″W	Meridian	
14	Highlands Historic District	Highlands Historic District	August 21, 1987 (#87000467)	Roughly bounded by 15th St., 34th Ave., 5th St., 19th St., and 36th Ave. 32°22′29″N 88°42′41″W	Meridian	
15	Lacy Homestead	Lacy Homestead	July 19, 2007 (#07000747)	Address restricted	Toomsuba	
16	Lamar Hotel	Lamar Hotel	December 18, 1979 (#79003393)	410 21st St. 32°21′52″N 88°41′54″W	Meridian	
17	Alex Loeb Building	Alex Loeb Building	December 18, 1979 (#79003394)	2115 5th St. 32°21′51″N 88°41′56″W	Meridian	
18	Masonic Temple	Masonic Temple	December 18, 1979 (#79003395)	1220 26th Ave. 32°22′10″N 88°42′16″W	Meridian	Sometime after its listing the building was demolished.
19	McLemore Cemetery	McLemore Cemetery	December 18, 1979 (#79003396)	601 16th Ave. 32°22′03″N 88°41′41″W	Meridian	
20	Meridian Downtown Historic District	Meridian Downtown Historic District	January 16, 2007 (#06001249)	Roughly bounded by 26th Ave., 18th Ave., 6th St., and Front St. 32°21′50″N 88°41′59″W	Meridian	
21	Meridian Museum of Art	Meridian Museum of Art	December 18, 1979 (#79003397)	628 25th Ave. 32°21′49″N 88°42′12″W	Meridian	Art museum for many years; formerly the Carnegie Library for whites in Meridian
22	Meridian Senior High School and Junior College	Meridian Senior High School and Junior College	May 29, 2014 (#14000275)	2320 32nd St. 32°23′27″N 88°42′07″W	Meridian	
23	Meridian Urban Center Historic District	Meridian Urban Center Historic District	December 18, 1979 (#79003732)	Roughly bounded by 21st and 25th Aves., 6th St., and the former Gulf, Mobile and Ohio railroad line 32°21′47″N 88°42′01″W	Meridian	
24	Meridian Waterworks Pumping Station and Clear Water Basin	Meridian Waterworks Pumping Station and Clear Water Basin	July 26, 1989 (#89000931)	B St. and 17th Ave. 32°21′43″N 88°41′30″W	Meridian	
25	Merrehope	Merrehope	December 9, 1971 (#71000455)	905 31st Ave. 32°22′01″N 88°43′35″W	Meridian	
26	Merrehope Historic District	Merrehope Historic District	September 19, 1988 (#88000973)	Roughly bounded by 33rd Ave., 30th Ave., 14th St., 25th Ave., and 8th St. 32°22′05″N 88°42′26″W	Meridian	
27	Mid-Town Historic District	Mid-Town Historic District	August 21, 1987 (#87000463)	Roughly bounded by 23rd Ave., 15th St., 28th Ave., and 22nd St. 32°22′38″N 88°42′07″W	Meridian	
28	Municipal Building	Municipal Building	December 18, 1979 (#79003399)	601 24th Ave. 32°21′49″N 88°42′08″W	Meridian	
29	Niolon Building	Niolon Building	December 18, 1979 (#79003400)	718 23rd Ave. 32°21′53″N 88°42′05″W	Meridian	
30	Old Terminal Building, Hangar and Powerhouse at Key Field	Old Terminal Building, Hangar and Powerhouse at Key Field	July 7, 2003 (#03000587)	2525 U.S. Route 11, S. 32°20′14″N 88°44′33″W	Meridian	
31	Pigford Building	Pigford Building	December 18, 1979 (#79003401)	818 22nd Ave. 32°21′56″N 88°42′00″W	Meridian	
32	Poplar Springs Road Historic District	Poplar Springs Road Historic District	August 21, 1987 (#87000461)	Roughly bounded by 29th St., 23rd Ave., 22nd St., and 29th Ave. 32°23′05″N 88°42′11″W	Meridian	
33	Porter-Crawford House	Porter-Crawford House	December 18, 1979 (#79003402)	1208 22nd Ave. 32°22′09″N 88°42′01″W	Meridian	
34	St. Patrick Catholic Church	St. Patrick Catholic Church	December 18, 1979 (#79003403)	2614 Davis St. 32°21′48″N 88°42′17″W	Meridian	
35	The Simmons & Wright Company	The Simmons & Wright Company	March 13, 2008 (#08000198)	5493 U.S. Routes 11/80; 32°25′28″N 88°26′20″W	Kewanee	
36	Standard Drug Company	Standard Drug Company	December 7, 1989 (#89002050)	601 25th Ave. 32°21′46″N 88°42′12″W	Meridian	
37	Stevenson Primary School	Stevenson Primary School	December 18, 1979 (#79003405)	1015 25th Ave. 32°22′01″N 88°42′14″W	Meridian	
38	Stuckey's Bridge	Stuckey's Bridge	November 16, 1988 (#88002415)	Spans the Chunky River on a county road 32°15′20″N 88°51′19″W	Meridian	
39	Temple Theater	Temple Theater	December 18, 1979 (#79003407)	2318 8th St. 32°21′54″N 88°42′09″W	Meridian	
40	Threefoot Building	Threefoot Building	December 18, 1979 (#79003408)	601 22nd Ave. 32°21′52″N 88°42′02″W	Meridian	
41	Union Hotel	Union Hotel	December 18, 1979 (#79003409)	2000 Front St. 32°21′50″N 88°41′50″W	Meridian	
42	Union Station Historic District	Union Station Historic District	December 18, 1979 (#79003731)	Roughly bounded by 18th and 19th Aves., 5th St., and the former Gulf, Mobile and Ohio railroad line 32°21′54″N 88°41′46″W	Meridian	
43	US Post Office and Courthouse	US Post Office and Courthouse	May 17, 1984 (#84002236)	2100 9th St. 32°21′59″N 88°41′59″W	Meridian	
44	US Sugar Crop Field Station	US Sugar Crop Field Station	January 11, 1991 (#90002124)	Junction of Sonny Montgomery Industrial Parkway and Peavy Dr. 32°24′41″N 88°36′44″W	Meridian	
45	Wechsler School	Wechsler School	July 15, 1991 (#91000880)	1415 30th Ave. 32°22′17″N 88°42′33″W	Meridian	First brick school building built in the state, in 1894, for black children in elementary grades
46	West End Historic District	West End Historic District	August 21, 1987 (#87000459)	Roughly bounded by 7th St., 28th Ave., Shearer's Branch, and 5th St. 32°21′46″N 88°42′29″W	Meridian	

== Former listings ==
	Name on the Register	Image	Date listed	Date removed	Location	City or town	Description
1	Dial House		December 18, 1979 (#79003388)	January 28, 2016	1003 30th Ave. 32°22′00″N 88°42′32″W	Meridian	Demolished in February 2005.
2	Dixie Gas Station	Dixie Gas Station	February 6, 1980 (#79003389)	October 1, 1987		Meridian	Demolished in 1986.
3	Gulf, Mobile & Ohio Freight Depot		February 6, 1980 (#79003392)	November 8, 1996	20 22nd Ave.	Meridian	Destroyed by fire on June 10, 1985.
4	Meridian Baptist Seminary		January 8, 1979 (#79001326)	July 16, 2008	16th St. and 31st Ave.	Meridian	Destroyed by fire in 2007.
5	Meyer-Loeb Building		February 6, 1980 (#79003398)	October 1, 1987	2100 4th St.	Meridian	Demolished in 1980.
6	Scottish Rite Cathedral		December 18, 1979 (#79003404)	May 15, 1987	1101 23rd Ave.	Meridian	Destroyed by fire on March 20, 1985.
7	Suttle Building		December 18, 1979 (#79003406)	December 15, 1999	801 22nd Ave.	Meridian	Demolished in February 1999.

== See also ==
- List of National Historic Landmarks in Mississippi
- National Register of Historic Places listings in Mississippi
