= Pigford =

Pigford is a surname. Notable people with the surname include:

- Eva Pigford (born 1984), known professionally as Eva Marcille, American actress
- Thomas H. Pigford (1922–2010), American engineer

== See also ==
- Angela Piggford (born 1963), English athlete
- Pigford Building, building in Meridian, Mississippi, United States
- Pigford House, building near Clinton, Sampson County, North Carolina, United States
- Pigford v. Glickman, 1999 United States federal court case
