= Standard Drug Company =

Standard Drug Company may refer to one of two pharmaceutical companies in the United States:

- Standard Drug Company (Richmond, Virginia), a historic drug company in Richmond, Virginia
- Standard Drug Company (Meridian, Mississippi), listed on the National Register of Historic Places in Lauderdale County, Mississippi
