= P. J. Krouse =

American architect

Penn Jeffries Krouse (September 23, 1877–April 1944), usually known as P. J. Krouse was a prolific architect in the state of Mississippi. Many of his buildings were located in the Meridian area.

== Personal life ==
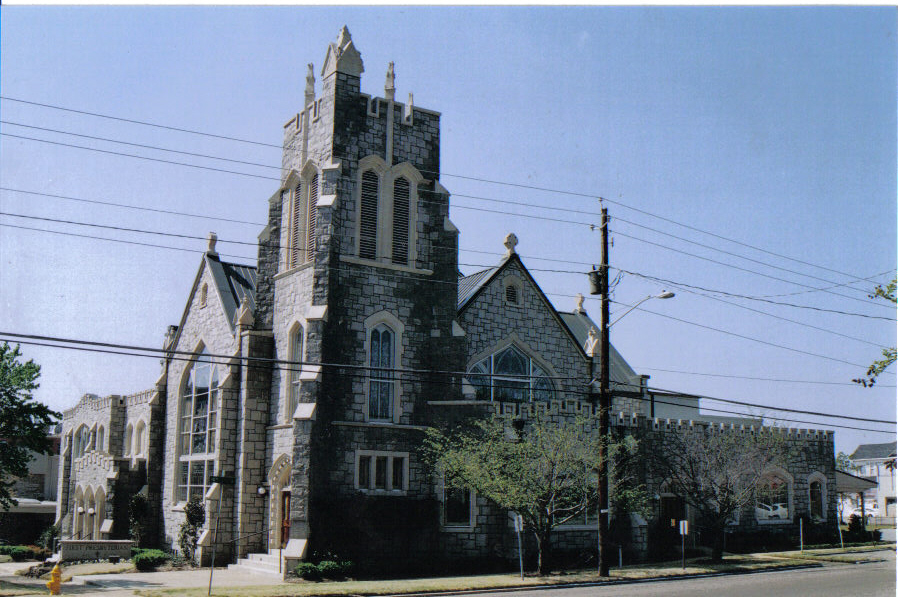
Funeral services for Emily Krouse, daughter of P. J., were held at First Presbyterian Church of Meridian, which P.J. designed in 1913.

Penn Jeffries Krouse was born on September 23, 1877, to parents Adrian Zick Krouse and Ann Ruben Jeffries. Krouse had three children with his wife, Martha Rebecca Dillehay: Adrian Alonzo, Charles Dabbs, and Emily Bonner. Emily was born in Meridian on August 29, 1909, and died in Atlanta, Georgia on September 7, 2003. Her funeral services were held at First Presbyterian Church of Meridian, a church which her father designed. Charles would later become an architect himself. P.J. and Martha later divorced, and P.J. married Katherine Barham.

Krouse was a member of the Scottish Rite subgroup of Freemasonry. He was also appointed as the chairman of the War Price and Rationing Administration during World War II. His health deteriorated during his time as chairman, forcing him to resign. He died in April 1944.

== Projects ==
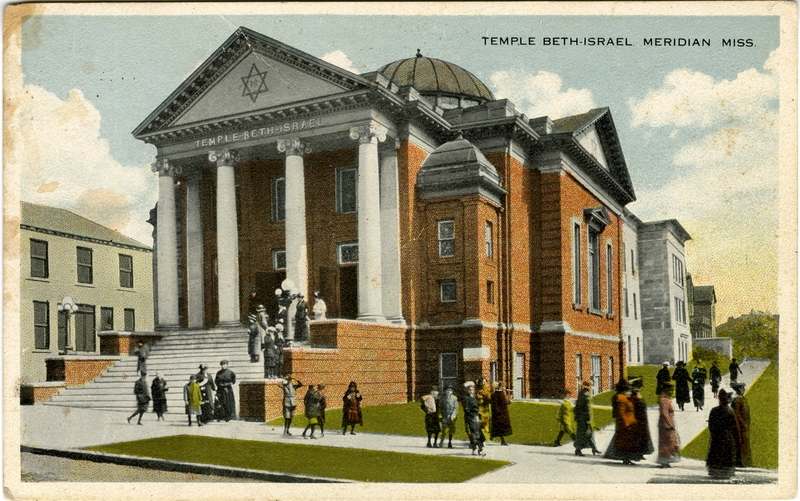
Beth Israel temple, 1906

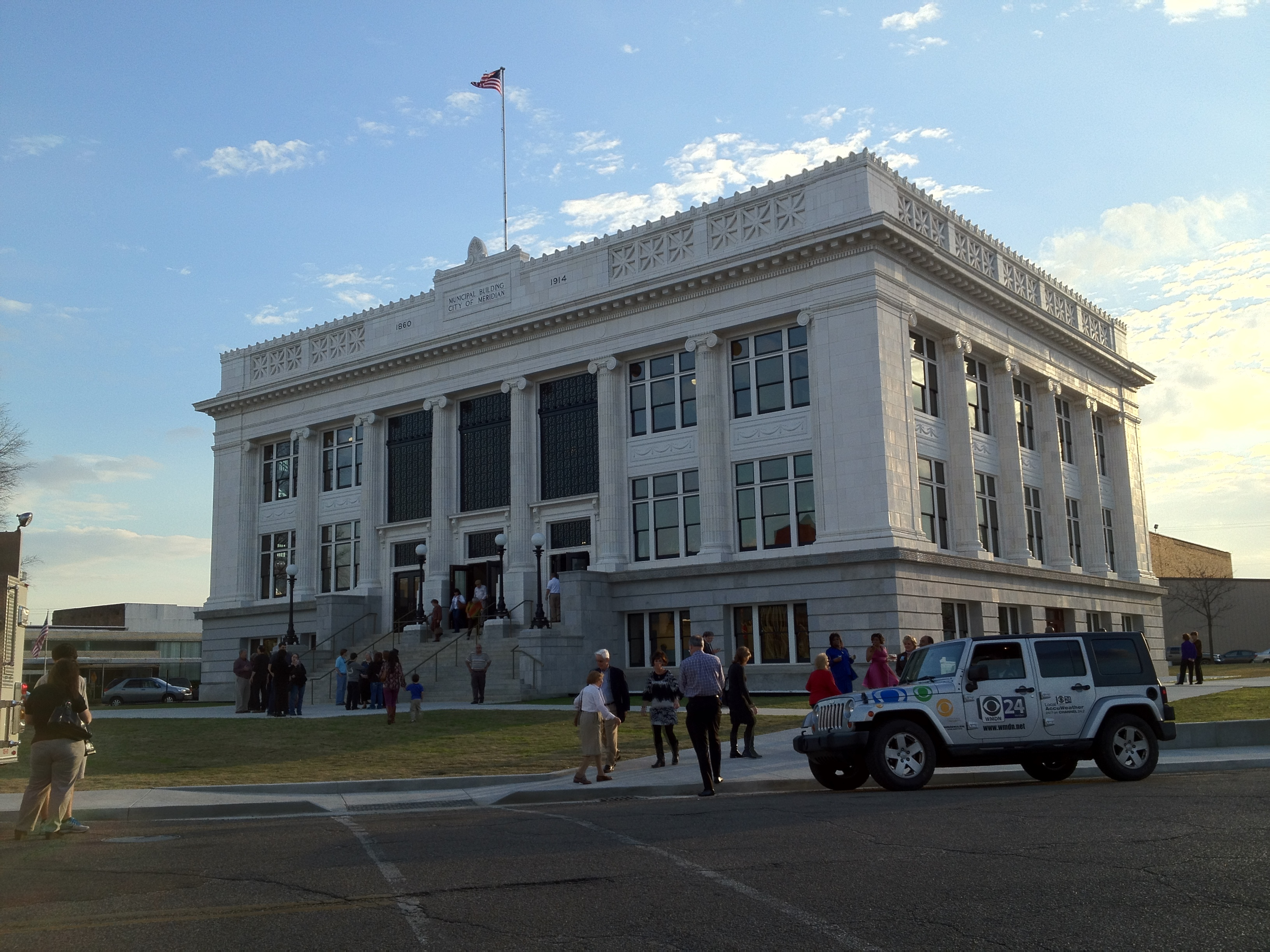
Meridian City Hall, 1914

Buildings designed by Krouse span a wide range of architectural styles including Greek Revival, Gothic Revival, Egyptian Revival, Beaux Arts, and Art Deco. Krouse designed buildings in Meridian and Laurel, Mississippi, as well as courthouses in Clarke, Jones, Yalobusha, Lauderdale, and Pearl River County.

Many buildings Krouse designed or helped to design are listed on the National Register of Historic Places.

=== Works ===
- Bobo Senior High School Building – 131 School St., Clarksdale, NRHP-listed
- Clarke County Courthouse and Confederate Monument – Archusa St. at head of Main St., Quitman, NRHP-listed
- First Presbyterian Church of Meridian – 911 23rd Ave., Meridian, NRHP-listed
- Jones County Courthouse – Ellisville, NRHP-listed
- Alex Loeb Building – 2115 5th St., Meridian, NRHP-listed
- Masonic Temple – 1220 26th Ave., Meridian, NRHP-listed
- Meridian City Hall – 601 24th Ave., Meridian, NRHP-listed as Municipal Building
- Stevenson Primary School – 1015 25th Ave., Meridian, NRHP-listed
- U.S. Post Office and Courthouse – 2100 9th St., Meridian, NRHP-listed
- Scottish Rite Cathedral (1914), which was listed on the National Register until it was destroyed by fire in 1985.
- Former Beth Israel synagogue (1906) of the Congregation Beth Israel of Meridian. This was a Greek Revival octagonal synagogue built in 1906. It was used until 1964 and subsequently demolished.
- One or more buildings in NRHP-listed Laurel Central Historic District, roughly bounded by Tenth and Thirteenth Sts., First Ave., Seventh and Fifth Sts., and Eighth Ave., Laurel
- One or more buildings in NRHP-listed Meridian Downtown Historic District, roughly bounded by Twenty-Sixth Ave., Eighteenth Ave., Sixth St., and Front St., Meridian
- Margaret Martin High School
- Newton County Courthouse (1912) (5th) in Decatur, Mississippi
- Pearl River County Courthouse (1918-1920)
