= McLemore Cemetery =

Cemetery in Mississippi, USA

- U.S. National Register of Historic Places
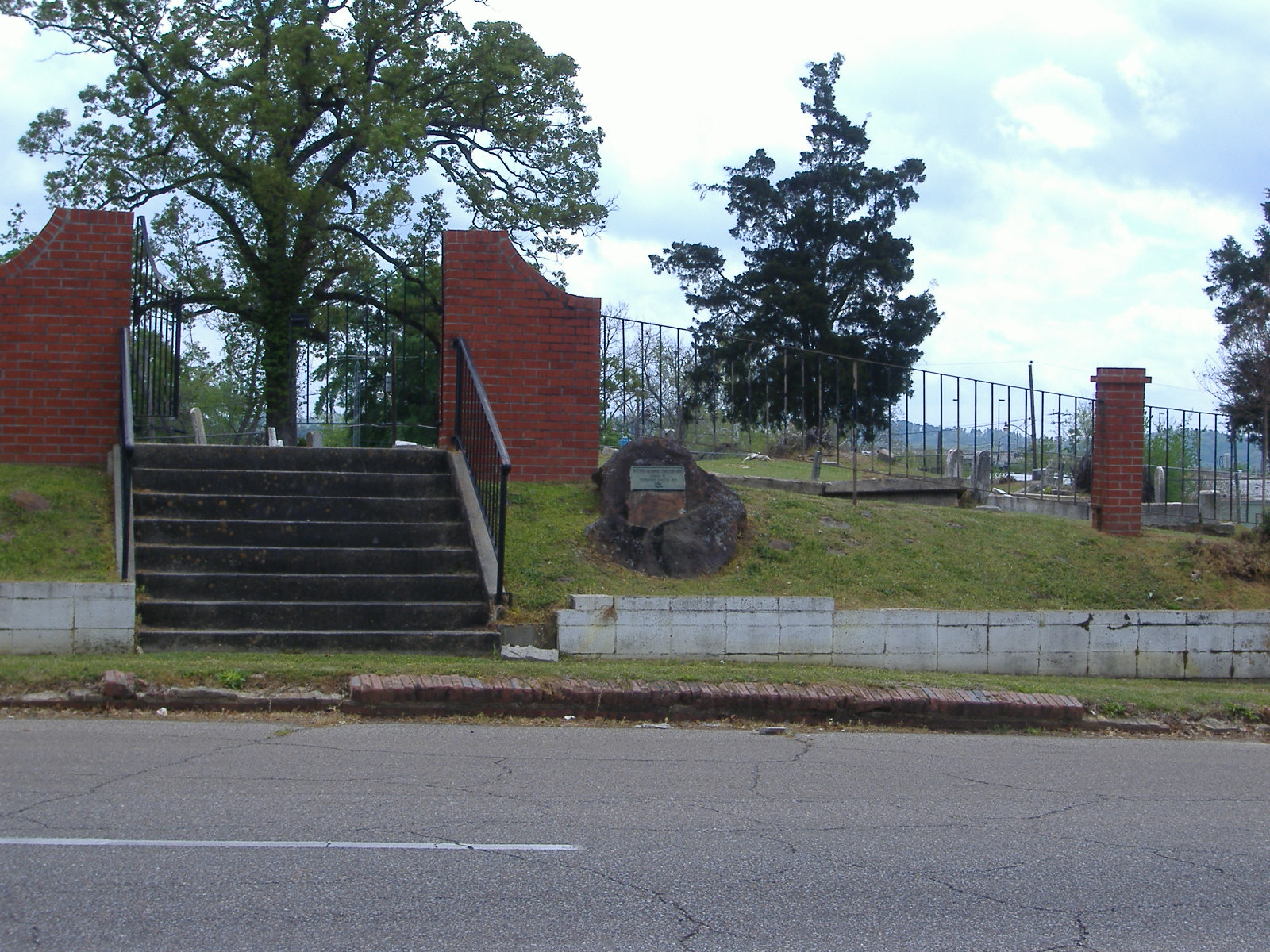
- Entrance to McLemore Cemetery in 2008

- Location within Mississippi Location within the United States
- Location: 601 16th Avenue, Meridian, Lauderdale County, Mississippi, U.S.
- Coordinates: 32°22′3″N 88°41′41″W
- Built: 1839
- MPS: Meridian MRA
- NRHP reference No.: 79003396
- Added to NRHP: December 18, 1979

McLemore Cemetery is a historic cemetery in Meridian, Mississippi, United States. The cemetery was listed on the National Register of Historic Places on December 18, 1979, and is the oldest surviving historic site in the city.

== History ==
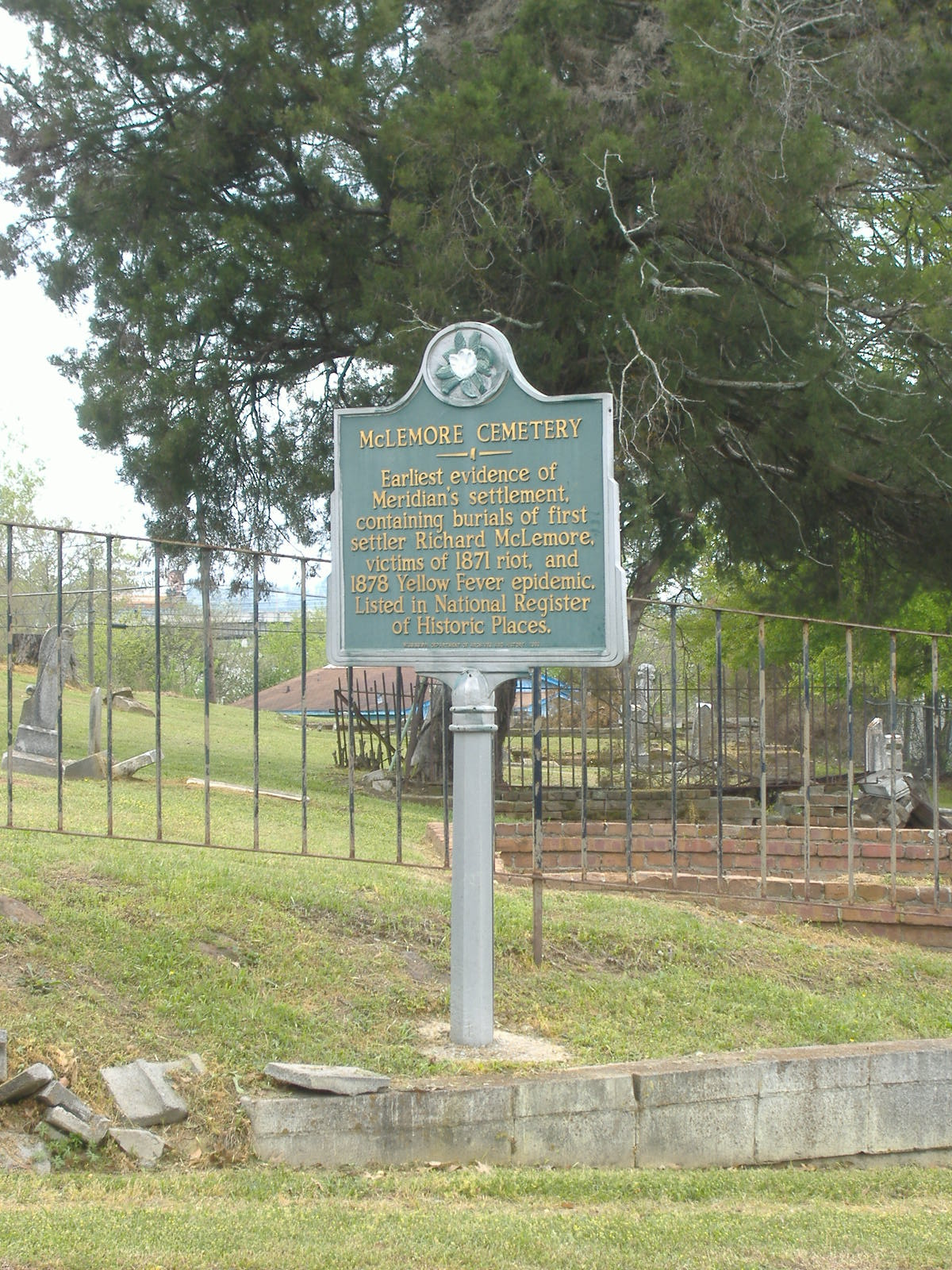
Historical Marker in front of cemetery

Richard McLemore, founder of the cemetery, was the first permanent settler of Meridian in the 1830s. In 1839, McLemore established the cemetery behind a Baptist Church he had built at 6th St and 16th Ave, just outside East End Historic District. McLemore is now buried in the cemetery, along with fatalities of the 1871 race riot and the 1878 Yellow Fever epidemic. Masonic Lodge members reportedly helped treat victims of the outbreak, which explains the numerous Masons now buried in the cemetery.

The cemetery contains around 100 gravesites, the earliest from the 1830s and the most recent from 1942. Since then, the cemetery has been in a state of degradation with overgrown grass and weeds and crumbling headstones. In 1971 Carol James, head of genealogy research at Meridian Public Library, conducted a census of the identifiable gravesites in the cemetery, totalling 96. The census can now be viewed in the library. James reported about the cemetery's lack of upkeep, stating that vandalism of headstones had been a problem. By 2006 many headstones were in such bad condition that the names were no longer distinguishable. Others had been covered by weeds and other growth, or had moved significantly from their original locations.

== See also ==
- National Register of Historic Places listings in Lauderdale County, Mississippi
