= Cahn-Crawford House =

United States historic place

- U.S. National Register of Historic Places
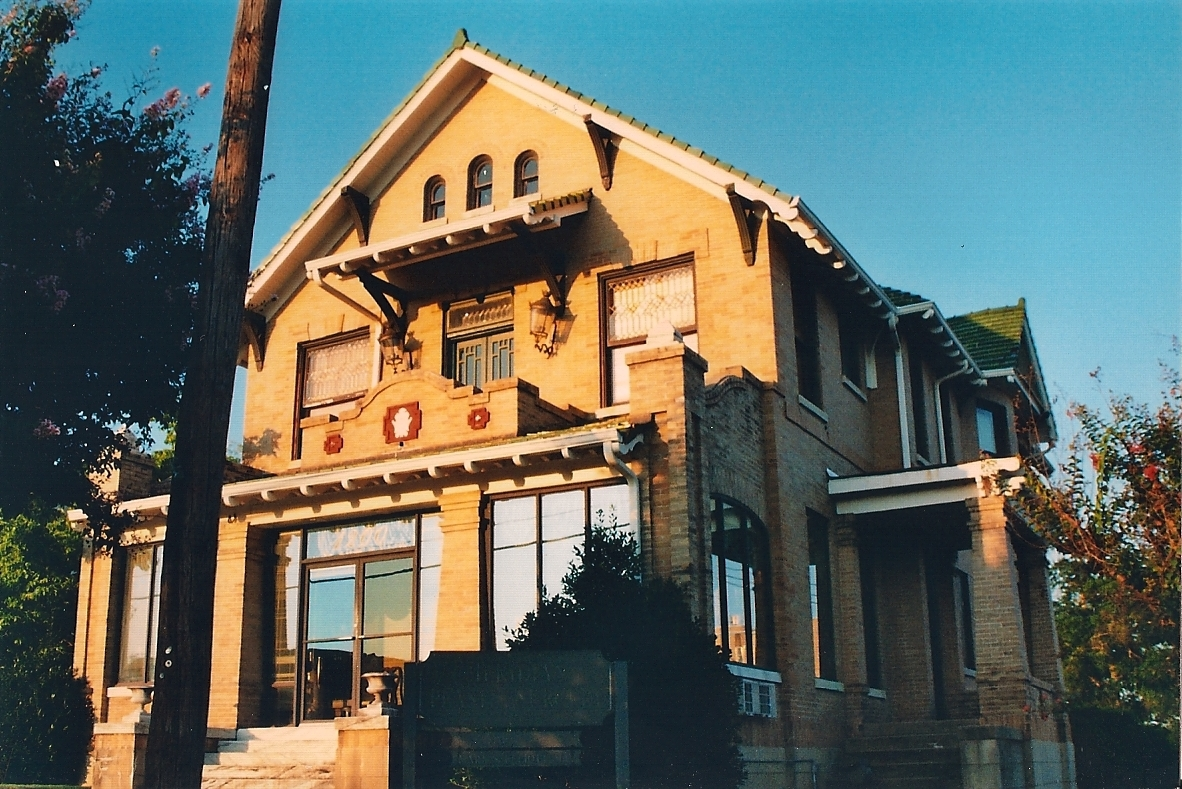

- Location within Mississippi Location within the United States
- Location: 1200 22nd Ave., Meridian, Mississippi
- Coordinates: 32°22′7″N 88°42′1″W
- Area: less than one acre
- Built: 1918
- Architectural style: eclectic
- MPS: Meridian MRA
- NRHP reference No.: 79003384
- Added to NRHP: December 18, 1979

The Cahn-Crawford House at 1200 22nd Avenue in Meridian, Mississippi was built in 1918. The house was built by a businessman named E. Cahn, the same person who owned the Masonic Temple in the city.

The structure is a two-story tan and dark brown brick building with a green-tiled roof. A large marble staircase on the street side of the building leads to a balconied entry portico with corner piers capped by stone finials.

The building was listed on the National Register of Historic Places in 1979, after being included in the Meridian Multiple Resource Area, a study of possibly noteworthy buildings in the city.
