= Mississippi Plan =

Anti-Reconstruction political strategy

The Mississippi Plan of 1874–1875 was developed by white Southern Democrats as part of the white insurgency during the Reconstruction era in the Southern United States. It was devised by the Democratic Party in that state to overthrow the Republican Party in Mississippi by means of organized threats of violence and voter suppression against African American citizens and white Republican supporters. Democrats sought to regain political control of the state legislature and governor's office "peaceably if we can, forcibly if we must." Their justifications were articulated on a basis of discontent with governor Adelbert Ames' Republican administration, including spurious charges of corruption and high taxes. However, the violence that followed was centred on the desire to return white supremacy to the state. The success of the disfranchisement policy led to similar plans being adopted by white Democrats in every Southern state after 1890.

To end election violence and ensure that freedmen were excluded from politics, the Democrat-dominated state legislature passed a new constitution in 1890, which effectively disenfranchised and disarmed most blacks by erecting barriers to voter registration and firearms ownership. Disenfranchisement was enforced through terrorist violence and fraud, and most black people stopped trying to register or vote. They did not regain the power to vote until the late 1960s when the federal Voting Rights Act of 1965 was passed to authorize federal oversight of state practices and protect citizens' right to vote.

== History ==
During Reconstruction era from 1865 to 1877, former slaves were granted citizenship and African-American men were granted the franchise by the 14th and 15th Amendments. The consequences of this were far-reaching and almost immediate, as freedmen eagerly registered and flooded the polls. Freedmen overwhelming registered as Republicans, allying with the party that had secured their emancipation. But they voted for white Republican candidates as well as for blacks.

For example, in the black-majority state of Mississippi, of the 100 delegates to the Mississippi constitutional convention that drafted the Reconstruction constitution, only 16 were black.

In Mississippi's 1874 election, the Republican Party carried a 30,000 majority in what had been a Democratic Party stronghold when only whites voted. Republicans took the governor's office and some legislative seats, but blacks never held a majority of seats in any of the state legislatures, although that was their proportion of the population. Freedmen and other blacks (some free blacks had migrated from the North to work in the state), were elected to many local offices and held 10 of 36 seats in the state legislature that year. (They comprised a large majority of the population and voted for white Republicans as well as blacks.)

In 1874 whites in the city of Vicksburg were determined to suppress black voting in that year's election. White armed patrols prevented blacks from voting; Democrats succeeded in defeating all Republican city officials in the August election. By December the emboldened party forced the black county sheriff, Peter Crosby, to flee to the state capital. Blacks who rallied to the city to aid the sheriff also had to flee in the face of overwhelming white forces, as armed whites flooded the city. Over the next few days, armed white gangs may have murdered up to 300 blacks in the city and its vicinity, in what became known as the Vicksburg riots.

U.S. President Ulysses S. Grant sent a company of troops to Vicksburg in January 1875 to quell the violence and allow the sheriff's safe return. The sheriff Crosby was shot by his white deputy, A. Gilmer on June 7, 1875, and survived with a severe injury.

In 1875, under their Mississippi Plan, the Democrats conducted a political dual-pronged battle to reverse Republican strength in the state. White paramilitary organizations such as the Red Shirts arose to serve as "the military arm of the Democratic Party." Unlike the Ku Klux Klan at the time (which was mostly defunct by then), the Red Shirts operated and paraded openly, with members known in local areas. They sometimes invited newspaper coverage of their parades and activities, and their goals were political – to throw out the Republicans. They were well-armed, with private financing for the purchase of new weapons as they took on more power. The first step was to persuade the 10 to 15 percent of Scalawags (white Republicans) to vote with the Democratic party. Outright attacks and economic and political pressure convinced many carpetbaggers to switch parties or flee the state.

The second step of the Mississippi Plan was intimidation of freedmen and their families. Planters, landlords and merchants used economic coercion against black sharecroppers and farmers, with limited success. The Red Shirts more often used violence, including whippings and murders, and intimidation at the polls. They were joined in the violence by white paramilitary groups known as "rifle clubs," who frequently provoked riots at Republican rallies, shooting down dozens of blacks in the ensuing conflicts.

Although the governor requested Federal troops to curb the violence, President Ulysses S. Grant hesitated to act. He feared being accused of "bayonet rule" – which he believed would undoubtedly be exploited by Democrats to carry Ohio in that year's state elections. The violence went unchecked and the plan worked as intended: during Mississippi's 1875 statewide election, five counties with large black majorities polled only 12, 7, 4, 2, and 0 Republican votes, respectively. The Republican dominance by 30,000 votes in the 1874 national and city elections was reversed in 1875, with polls showing a Democratic majority of 30,000 in statewide elections.

The success of the white Democrats in Mississippi influenced the growth of Red Shirt chapters in North and South Carolina as well, which also had thousands of white men involved in rifle clubs. The Red Shirts were particularly prominent in suppressing black votes in majority-black counties in South Carolina. Historians estimated that they committed 150 murders in the weeks leading up to the 1876 election in South Carolina. Louisiana also produced white insurgents, known as the White League, who together with rifle clubs likewise suppressed black voting in the state by violence from 1874 on.

== Mississippi constitution of 1890 ==
In 1877, U.S. federal troops were withdrawn from the Southern states, due to the national Compromise of 1877. White Democrats had control of all southern state legislatures, although blacks continued to be elected to local offices through the 1880s.

In 1890 the Democratic-dominated constitutional convention passed a new constitution for Mississippi. It effectively disenfranchised the great majority of Blacks in the state by a method of poll taxes, subjective literacy tests, and more restrictive residency requirements. When these legal provisions, which used race-neutral language but were enforced in a discriminatory manner, survived legal challenges to the United States Supreme Court, other Southern U.S. states, such as South Carolina and Oklahoma, adopted similar provisions in new constitutions or laws.

Across the South by 1908, wealthy white Democrats disenfranchised most black people and many poor whites (especially in Alabama) by enacting such new state constitutions. Black people were effectively excluded from participating in the formal political system of the American South until the 1960s, after gaining federal legislation to support and defend their right to vote.

== See also ==
- Disenfranchisement after the Reconstruction Era
- Opelousas massacre
- Meridian race riot of 1871, event in Meridian, Mississippi
- White backlash
