= Scottish Rite Cathedral (Meridian, Mississippi) =

- Formerly listed on the U.S. National Register of Historic Places
- Location within Mississippi Location within the United States
- Location: 1101 23rd Ave., Meridian, Mississippi
- Area: less than one acre
- Built: 1914
- Architect: Krouse, P.J.; Cass Construction Co.
- Architectural style: Late 19th and 20th Century Revivals, Egyptian Revival
- MPS: Meridian MRA
- NRHP reference No.: 79003404

Significant dates
- Added to NRHP: 1979
- Removed from NRHP: May 15, 1987

The Scottish Rite Cathedral in Meridian, Mississippi is a former building that was listed on the United States National Register of Historic Places. The building was designed in Egyptian Revival style by prolific Meridian architect P.J. Krouse, who also designed Meridian City Hall in 1915 and the 1906 Greek Revival building used by Congregation Beth Israel.

== History ==
The site of the former building was originally the site of the Methodist Mississippi Female College (MFC), established in 1869 as the city's second oldest college (only surpassed by the Baptist MFC, established in 1865). The Methodist MFC was later converted into Beeson's College.

The design of the Scottish Rite building was inspired by a trip to Egypt taken by Hyman W. Witcover, an architect from Savannah, Georgia. The architect was impressed by the Temple to Osiris on the island of Philae, now submerged due to the construction of the Aswan Dam. Witcover designed a Scottish Rite Cathedral with the hope that it would one day be built by the Scottish Rite. Krouse revised and resubmitted the plans in 1914 and supervised construction, which was carried out by the Cass Construction Company, located in Georgia. The three-story building was built into the side of a hill so that the northern facade appeared only two stories tall with a basement. Circling the whole building was an Egyptian-style gorge-and-roll cornice. A central projecting section on the northern side of the building contained a recessed entrance supported by columns with lotus flower capitals. A vulture and sundisk symbol was located in the entablature directly above the columns, and the front entrance was flanked by sphinxes covered in polychromatic terracotta and two obelisks.

Following destruction by fire on March 20, 1985, the building was delisted from the National Register in 1987.
