= First Presbyterian Church of Meridian =

Historic church in Mississippi, United States

- U.S. National Register of Historic Places
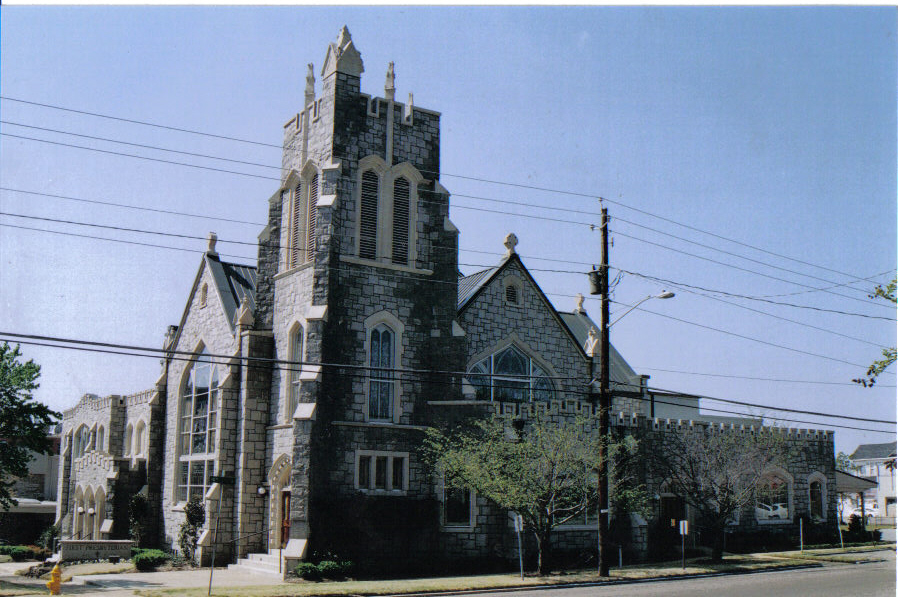

- Location within Mississippi Location within the United States
- Location: Meridian, Mississippi
- Coordinates: 32°21′59″N 88°42′6″W
- Built: 1913
- Architect: Penn Jeffries Krouse
- Architectural style: Late Gothic Revival
- MPS: Meridian MRA
- NRHP reference No.: 79003391
- Added to NRHP: December 18, 1979

First Presbyterian Church of Meridian is a historic church in Meridian, Mississippi, which is listed on the National Register of Historic Places. The church was founded in 1856 by eight members including John T. Ball and Lewis A. Ragsdale, founders of the city of Meridian. The reverend at the time was William Curtis Emerson.

From 1856 to 1867, the church met in the second floor of a store owned by one of the members. In 1867, the church had grown enough to construct a building on the corner of 25th Avenue and 7th Street in which to hold its services. After a fire on January 27, 1883, the building was destroyed; members of the church later rebuilt the structure using brick instead of wood. The church remained at its location on 25th Avenue and 7th Street until September 25, 1911, when it was sold to the city of Meridian. The city currently uses the building to house the Meridian Museum of Art.

After selling the old building, the church bought a lot at the corner of 23rd Avenue and 10th Street. The building, designed by architect Penn Jeffries Krouse, was built in 1913 and dedicated on March 29, 1914. In 1951, an educational building addition used for Sunday School was completed under the leadership of pastor Dr. J. Kelly Unger.

It was listed on the National Register in 1979. It was deemed more notable than other churches in Meridian for "its historical significance" and because it was designed by P.J. Krouse, "architect of most of Meridian's outstanding buildings from 1900-1920".

The sanctuary was renovated in 1982. In October 1996, the church bought an adjacent building which became the Administration & Education Building and is used for staff offices as well as both Adult Sunday School and committee meetings.
