= Porter-Crawford House =

Historic house in Mississippi, United States

- U.S. National Register of Historic Places
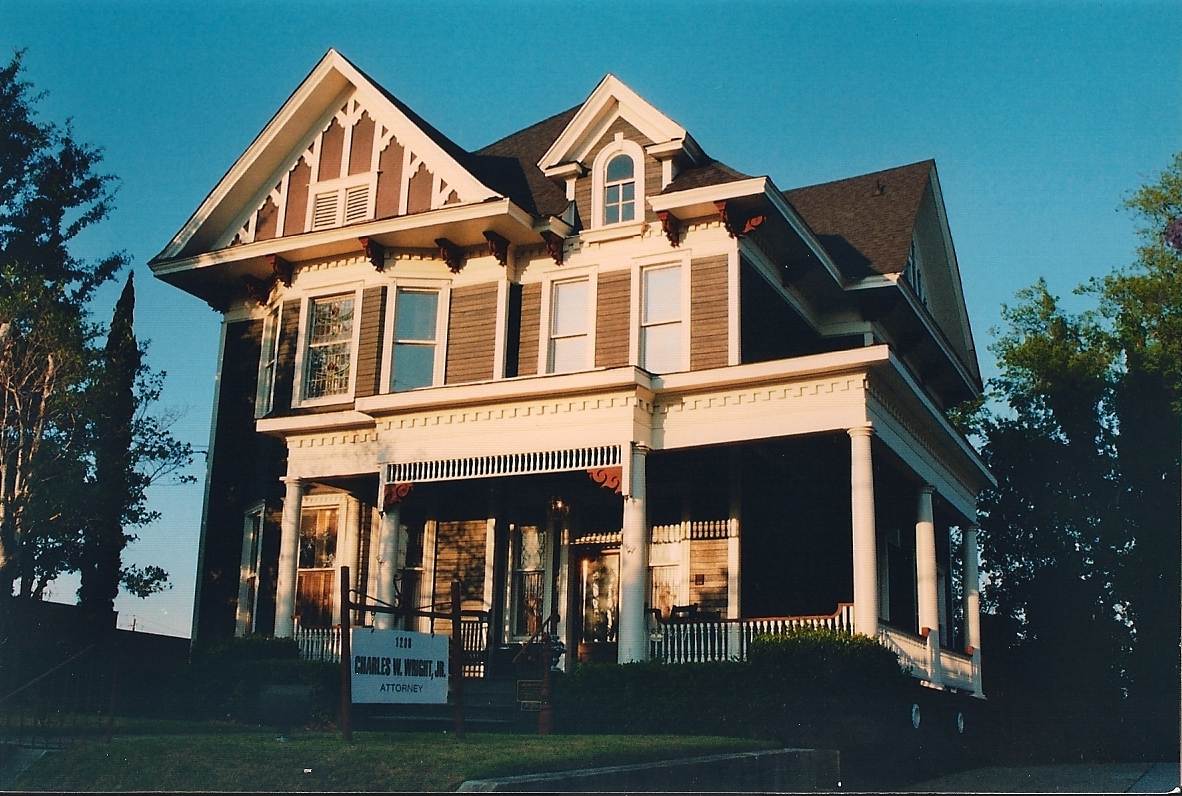

- Location within Mississippi Location within the United States
- Location: 1208 22nd Ave., Meridian, Mississippi
- Coordinates: 32°22′9″N 88°42′1″W
- Area: less than one acre
- Built: 1912
- Architectural style: Queen Anne
- MPS: Meridian MRA
- NRHP reference No.: 79003402
- Added to NRHP: December 18, 1979

The Porter-Crawford House, at 1208 22nd Ave. in Meridian, Mississippi, is a historic Queen Anne style house that was built in 1912. It was listed on the National Register of Historic Places in 1979 as part of a Multiple Property Submission.

It was deemed notable as "the only remaining example on 22nd Avenue of the Queen Anne style, a style once dominant on Silk Stocking Row."
