= Alex Loeb Building =

- U.S. National Register of Historic Places
- U.S. Historic district – Contributing property
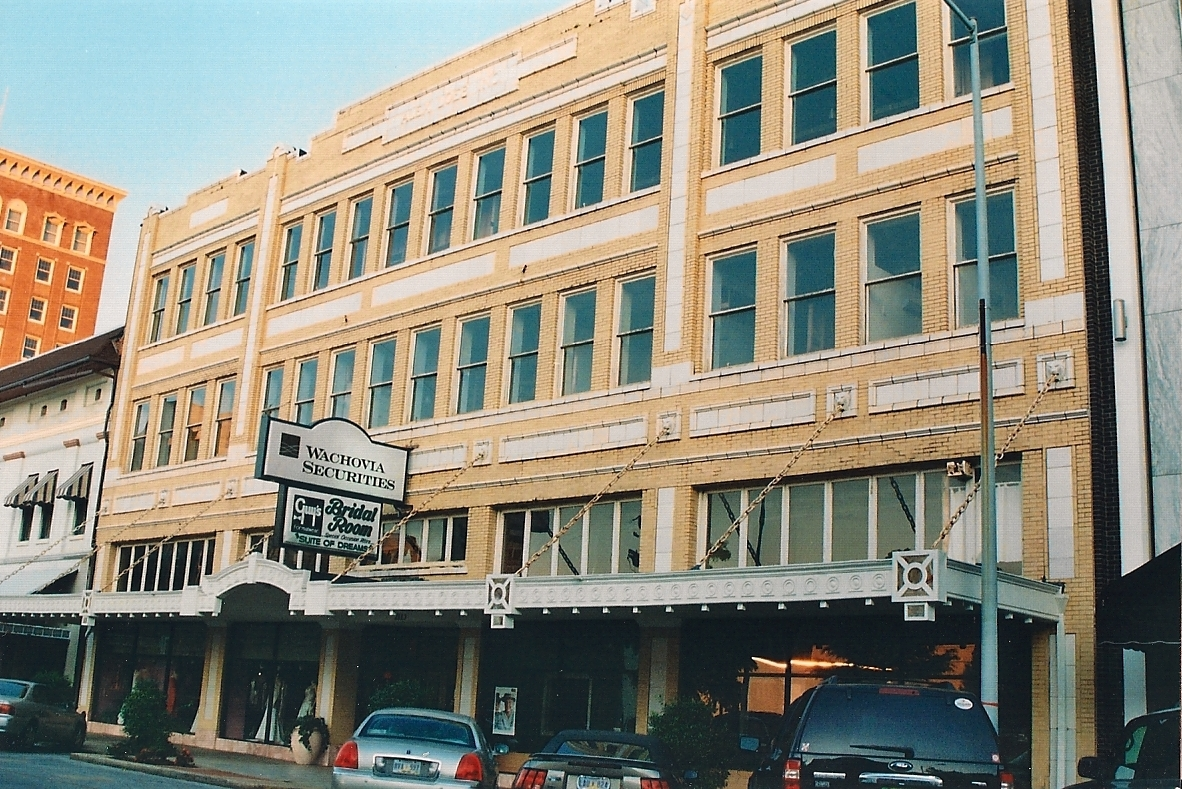
- Alex Loeb Building in 2009

- Location within Mississippi Location within the United States
- Location: 2115 5th St., Meridian, Mississippi
- Coordinates: 32°21′51″N 88°41′56″W
- Built: 1926
- Architect: P.J. Krouse
- Architectural style: Eclectic
- Part of: Meridian Downtown Historic District (ID06001249)
- MPS: Meridian MRA
- NRHP reference No.: 79003394
- Added to NRHP: December 18, 1979

The Alex Loeb Building is a historic structure in Meridian, Mississippi located at 2115 5th Street. Built in 1926, it was listed on the National Register of Historic Places in 1979. It is also a contributing property to the Meridian Downtown Historic District, listed in 2007.

The building was long home to a business owned by Alexander M. Loeb, an immigrant from Germany and a prominent figure in Meridian's history. The company was established in 1887 and was originally located on 25th Avenue. The company moved to the Rosenbaum Building, another iconic structure in downtown Meridian, in 1898 and remained there until 1926, when the current structure was built. The site of the building was previously home to J.H. O'Neill Marble Works, established in 1869 as one of the oldest businesses in the city.

The three-story building is one of many in Meridian designed by architect P.J. Krouse. Its most notable features include a terracotta decoration in the top bays as well as a parapet above each bay trimmed by terracota. The building also features a first floor canopy supported by heavy chains which emanate from the heads of lions attached under the second floor windows. Loeb is a habitational name for someone living at a house distinguished by the sign of a lion.

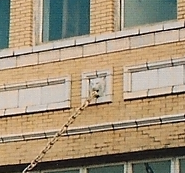
