= United States Post Office and Courthouse (Meridian, Mississippi) =

- U.S. National Register of Historic Places
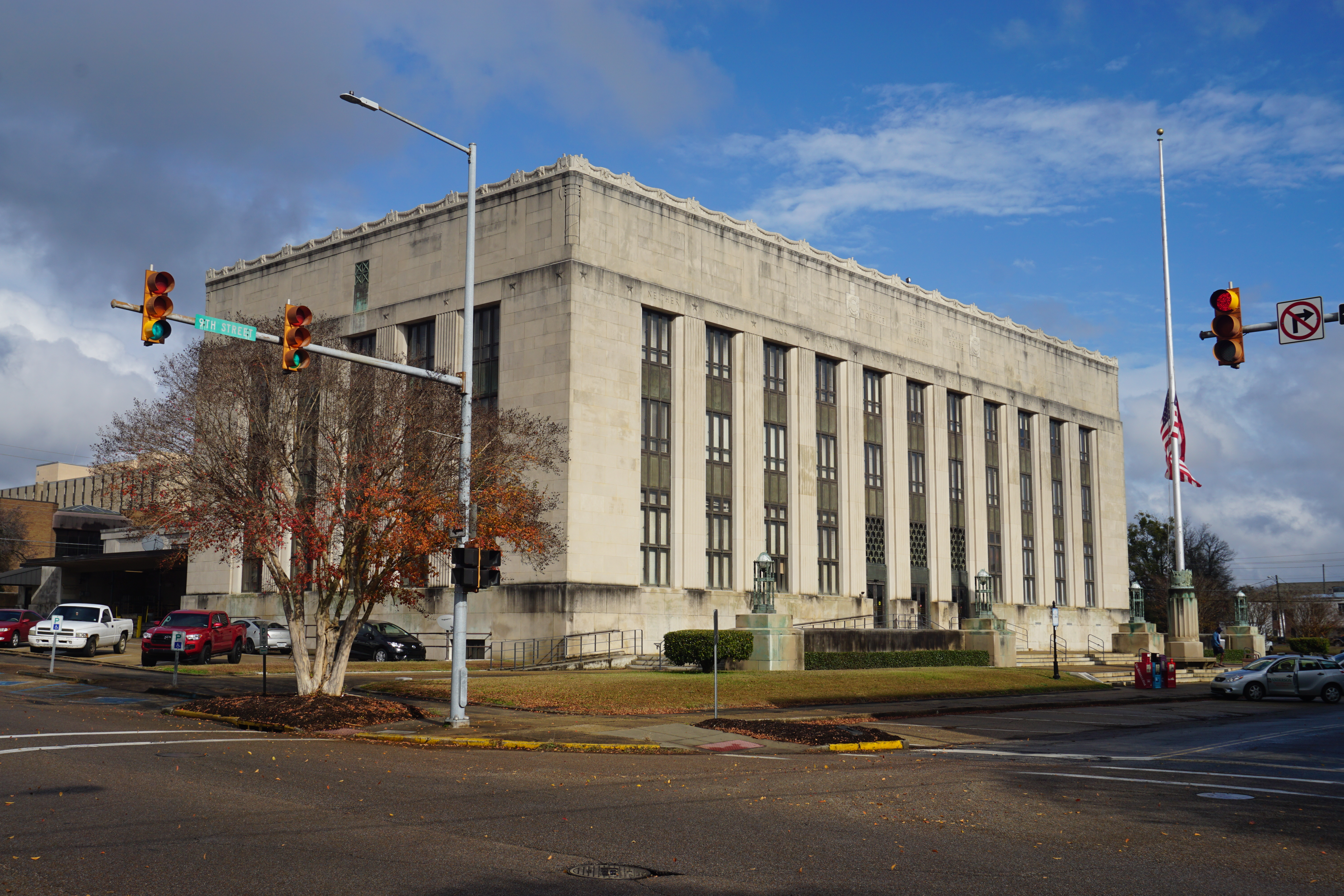
- Post Office-Courthouse in 2018

- Location within Mississippi Location within the United States
- Location: 2100 9th St, Meridian, Mississippi
- Coordinates: 32°21′59″N 88°41′59″W
- Area: 1.4 acres (0.57 ha)
- Built: 1933
- Architect: P.J. Krouse & Fort
- Architectural style: Art Deco
- NRHP reference No.: 84002236
- Added to NRHP: May 17, 1984

The United States Post Office and Courthouse in Meridian, Mississippi was built in 1933. It was listed on the National Register of Historic Places in 1984. It is a three-story limestone building built in a classical Art Deco style which was home to Meridian's main post office and a federal courthouse from its construction in 1933 until 2012 when the federal courthouse was closed due to budget cuts. The building itself is still open and still houses the post office.

== Previous buildings ==
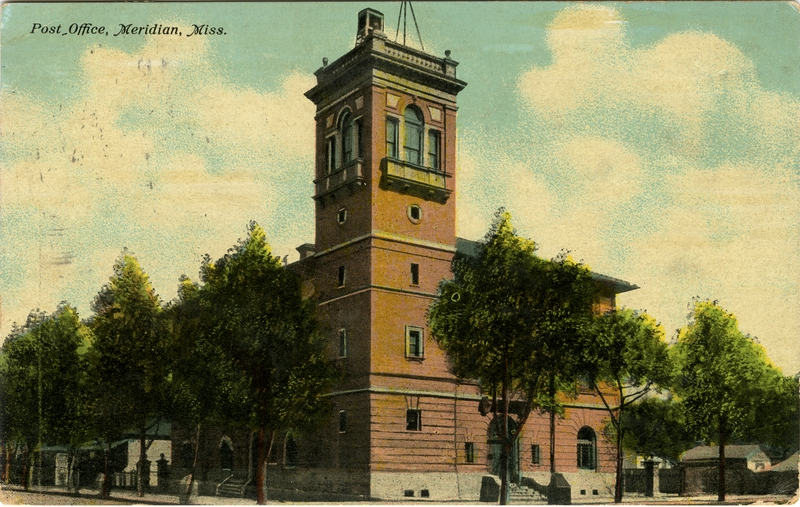
1898 post office and courthouse, demolished in the 1950s

When John T. Ball, one of the city's founders, bought land in the city in 1853, he built a log store on 26th Avenue and 7th Street. In this store, he persuaded the government to rent space for a small post office. In 1863, the post office was moved to the corner of 27th Avenue and Davis Street and would move five additional times before the building of the city's first Federal building in 1898. Meridian had begun a push for a Federal building as far back as 1888, and on January 2, 1898, The Meridian Star reported this dream had become a reality.

The new building was designed by architect William Martin Aiken. The $80,000 three-story structure was located at 8th Street and 22nd Avenue and housed not only the post office but the city's courthouse as well. The United States District Court for the Southern District of Mississippi met there until 1933, and the United States Circuit Court for the Southern District of Mississippi met there until that court was abolished in 1912. As the city grew, the building was used extensively. By 1899, the post office had five mail carriers and four in-house clerks. As demand increased, an addition was made to the east side of the building in 1911.

== Federal building ==
During the Great Depression, the state government added a new Federal building to nearly every town of importance and gave financial aid to the builders. The new Meridian Post Office and Courthouse was one of these buildings, located at 9th Street and 21st Avenue and noted for its mass and proportion rather than for its detail. The district court moved to the present courthouse when it was built in 1933, and the old building was demolished sometime in the 1950s.

The courthouse was designed by a local architectural firm headed by noted Meridian architect P.J. Krouse in the Art Deco style. The building's specific version of Art Deco is referred to as "simplified, or stripped, classical mode." Unlike decorative forms such as that of the Threefoot Building, also in Meridian, classical Art Deco buildings usually use monochromatic stone or brick and are usually shaped like classical temples. Another example of this classical Art Deco style in Mississippi is the War Memorial Building, a Mississippi Landmark in Jackson.

The building is a three-story limestone building with a basement and composition roof. Granite steps lead up to the main entrance, slightly above ground level, and there is a bronze grill with a decorative ear of corn design on it. The words "Neither snow nor rain nor gloom of night shall stay these couriers" are engraved in all capitals across the top of the front facade of the building. Above a terracotta coping is a parapet wall with a repeated design of an eagle and a steer with ears of corn hanging from his ears. A large flagpole with a marble base is outside the front entrance, and four lamps line the entrance-way. Each lamp is a glass world globe shaded with two colors of amber.

The front entrance opens to a foyer with two granite steps leading to the public lobby and a marble mosaic in the center of the floor. The foyer has four marble columns, two of which divide the steps, and two against each end wall. The lobby contains marble flooring and a building directory of cast bronze.

In 1963 under the General Services Administration, the basement and first floor of the building were extended in the rear, but the structural integrity of the exterior was not affected by the addition.

== Notable cases ==
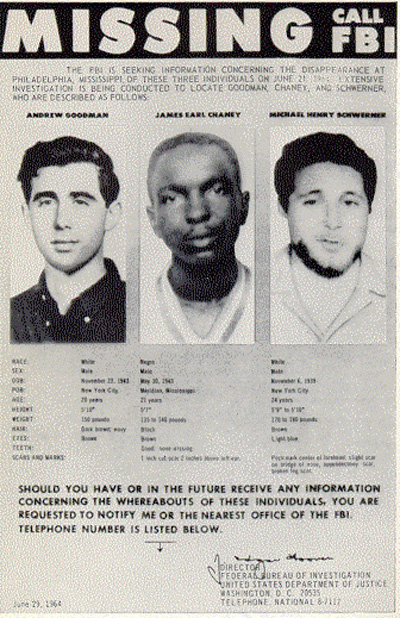
Missing Persons poster depicting (from left to right) Andrew Goodman, James Chaney, and Michael Schwerner the victims in United States v. Price, which was held at the Meridian courthouse.

The courthouse housed in the building was the setting of many notable cases, especially during the Civil Rights Movement. On May 31, 1961, James Meredith filed a lawsuit in the Meridian court against the University of Mississippi, and the initial trial was held in the courthouse. The suit would eventually go to the Supreme Court, which ruled in Meredith's favor. The Meridian courthouse was also the site of the United States v. Price case, in which 19 men were charged with the murders of James Chaney, Michael Schwerner, and Andrew Goodman in October 1967. The trial resulted in the conviction of 7 people and was the first time an all-white jury in Mississippi convicted a white person on civil rights charges.

Usage of the court declined (as it did in all federal courts) since the Civil Rights era, averaging only six to eight trials per year during the 1980s and 1990s, and even fewer in more recent years. No federal judges have been stationed in the courthouse since the '90s. Most filings since then have been made online, and judges are brought in from larger cities if needed for business.

== Closure of the courthouse ==
In September 2012, the Judicial Conference of the United States announced that it would no longer use the building for trials.
