= Riley Center =

- Grand Opera House
- U.S. National Register of Historic Places
- Mississippi Landmark
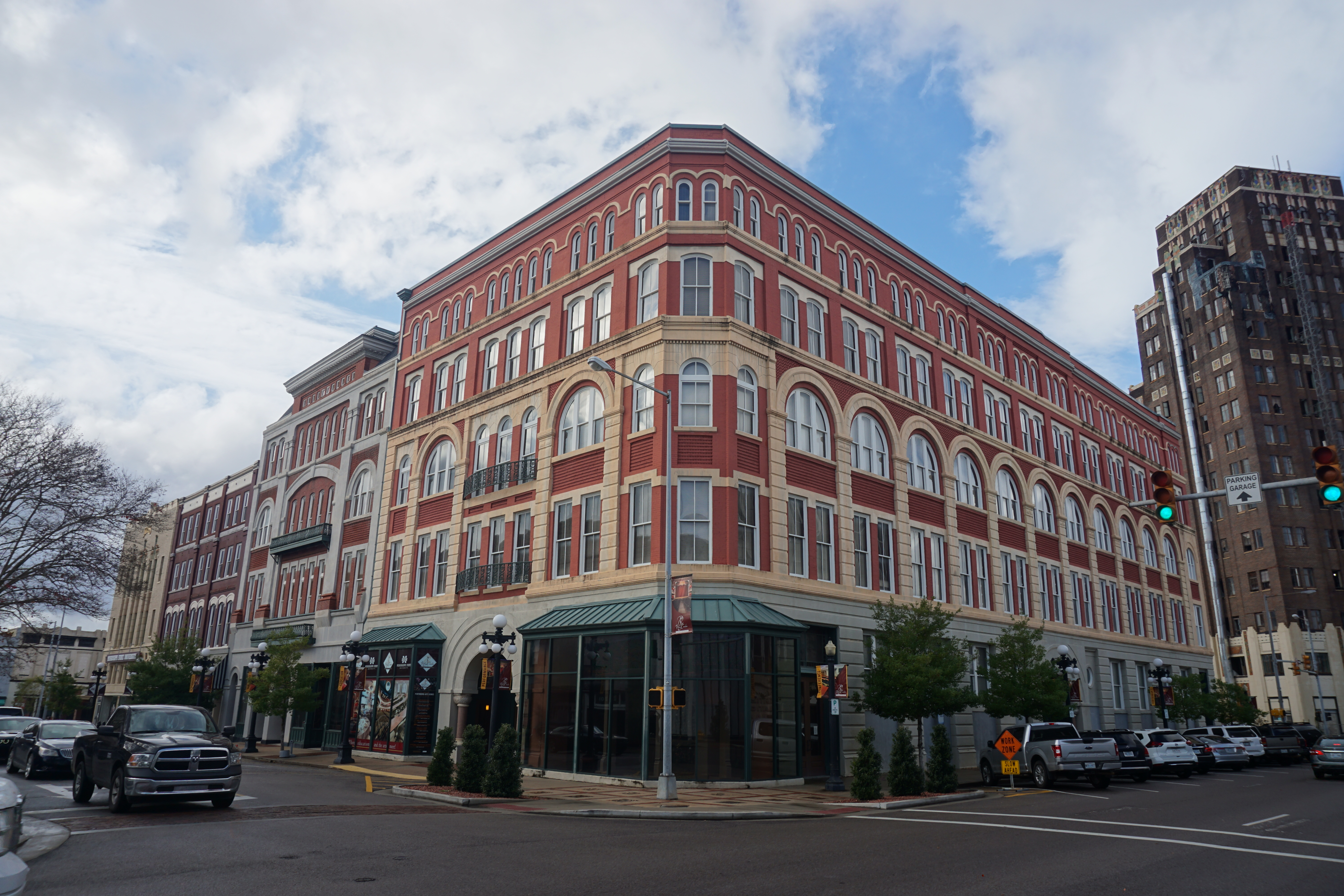
- Grand Opera House in 2018

- Location within Mississippi Location within the United States
- Location: Meridian, Mississippi
- Coordinates: 32°21′50″N 88°42′0″W
- Built: 1890
- Architect: Gustavus Maurice Torgerson; C.M. Rubush
- Architectural style: Late Victorian, Empire/Romanesque
- Visitation: ~63,000 (2007)
- MPS: Meridian MRA (AD)
- NRHP reference No.: 72000696
- USMS No.: 075-MER-0086-NR-ML

Significant dates
- Added to NRHP: December 27, 1972
- Designated USMS: June 7, 1991

The Riley Center, also known as the Grand Opera House and formally as the Mississippi State University Riley Center for Education and Performing Arts, is a performing arts and conference center in Meridian, Mississippi. It was added to the National Register of Historic Places in 1972.

The Grand Opera House and the adjacent Marks-Rothenberg Department store were built in 1889 by half-brothers Israel Marks and Levi Rothenberg. The opera house was a site for entertainment and theatre for decades.

In addition to the extensive theater renovation, the Riley Center project redeveloped the department store as a conference facility. Together the theater and conference space make up the Mississippi State University Riley Center for Education and Performing Arts, owned and operated by Mississippi State University-Meridian Campus.

== Original Opera House ==
=== Construction ===
In the late 19th century, Israel Marks and his half-brothers Levi, Sam, and Marx Rothenberg, expanded their retail operations by opening a new wholesale and retail mercantile store and an adjoining hotel. The site chosen covered almost a half a block—five lots facing 5th Street and three lots consuming the entire length of 22nd Avenue between 5th and 6th Streets. Construction began in 1889, under the direction of C.M. Rubush, a builder from Meridian. The exterior of the building was designed by Gustavus Maurice Torgerson, architect of Meridian's original City Hall. The designs included a mansard roof, establishing the architectural style as late Victorian, Empire/Romanesque.

For an unknown reason, construction of the hotel was interrupted in process, and the brothers decided to develop a Grand Opera House instead. Factors that may have influenced the decision may have been:

- The top price for a ticket to a first-run production by a traveling company with a star, set at $1.50 (about the same price as a room in a decent hotel)
- The profit margin would be much larger for an opera house than a hotel
- Torgerson was familiar with the highly successful Grand Opera House of New Orleans, completed only a few years earlier.
- Marks spent most of the year in New York City. He would have learned about the more successful shows, and, most probably, the booking and production houses of Klaw and Erlanger, the founders of the Syndicate—the most powerful commercial force in the American theatre at the turn of the century.

Seeking quality work, the Marks-Rothenberg partnership hired J.B. McElfatrick of New York and St. Louis to design the interior of the Grand Opera House. As of 1890 McElfatrick had designed dozens of theaters in the United States, including the National Theater in Washington, D.C., and the Metropolitan Opera House of Philadelphia.

The stage, at 30 feet wide by 50 feet deep, could accommodate the largest, most lavish shows from New York. Under the 35-foot high arched proscenium an ornate painted border featured the "Lady." The image of the "Lady" eventually became the symbol of the Opera House, and in the 21st century, the Grand Opera House is often referred to affectionately as "The Lady."

=== Performances ===
The Opera House was completed in late 1890, in time for the December 17 opening with Johann Strauss's recent operetta, The Gypsy Baron (1885), performed by a German-language company from New York. The same company performed Adolph Müller's romantic opera, The King's Fool (1891), the next night.

Unlike these European works, most plays or entertainments produced at the opera house were simple melodramas that would have been very familiar to the city's residents. But sometimes international figures performed here as part of national tours in the United States, or notable works were produced on similar tours; examples are the actress Sarah Bernhardt appearing in La Tosca, and a production of Henrik Ibsen's play, Ghosts (1881). This play about the hidden costs of sexual adventures must have created quite a stir in Southern society. The most popular form of entertainment at the opera house was the blackface minstrel show. White performers with black make-up on their faces impersonated African Americans, usually as caricatures, in a style related to vaudeville. African-American companies, such as "Black Patti," also performed here. Seating was segregated.

=== Alterations and renovations ===
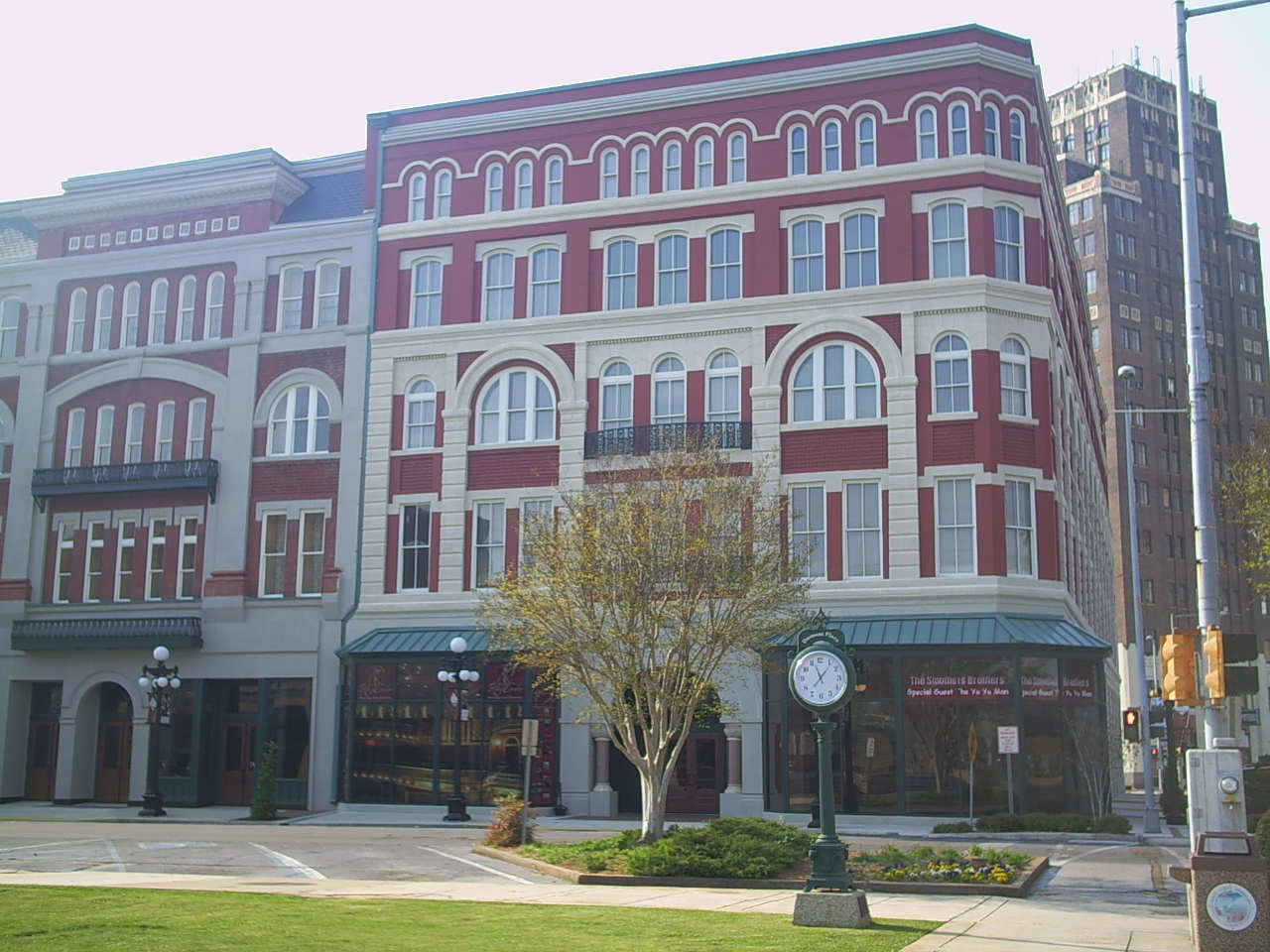
Front view

The Opera House was remodeled in 1902, reopening on September 17. The original entrance was moved to the left of the former gallery entry. Three marble steps led up to the entrance, which had a metal extension gate that could be closed when the theatre was dark. Electricity upgrades were also added in 1902.

The Opera House was remodeled again in May 1920, when it was converted in part to a movie theater, the new art form whose popularity was growing rapidly. The renovated theater opened on June 7, introducing the silver screen, which can still be seen in the backstage area of the theater. In this transition the gallery was divided into two areas, allowing a center opening for the film's projection.

=== Fall of the Opera House ===
The demise of the Opera House began in 1923, when it was leased to Saenger Films of New Orleans, under title of the Plaza Amusement Company, at a cost of $1,000 a month for a period of 25 years. The lease was for thirty years, but in 1927, Saenger bought the larger Temple Theater and wanted to gut the opera house for use as an office building. Because Levi Rothenberg, the previous owner (and builder) of the opera house had inserted a clause into the lease specifying that the building could be used only as a theater, Plaza Amusement abandoned it and refused to pay rent. After Saenger reneged on the lease, a long court battle ensued. The Rothenbergs eventually won the case, but the Great Depression had begun by then, Saenger had declared bankruptcy, Levi Rothenberg had died, and the Grand Opera House was closed.

After the Opera House closed, the department store continued to operate under various ownerships. It was in business until 1990.

== Restoration ==
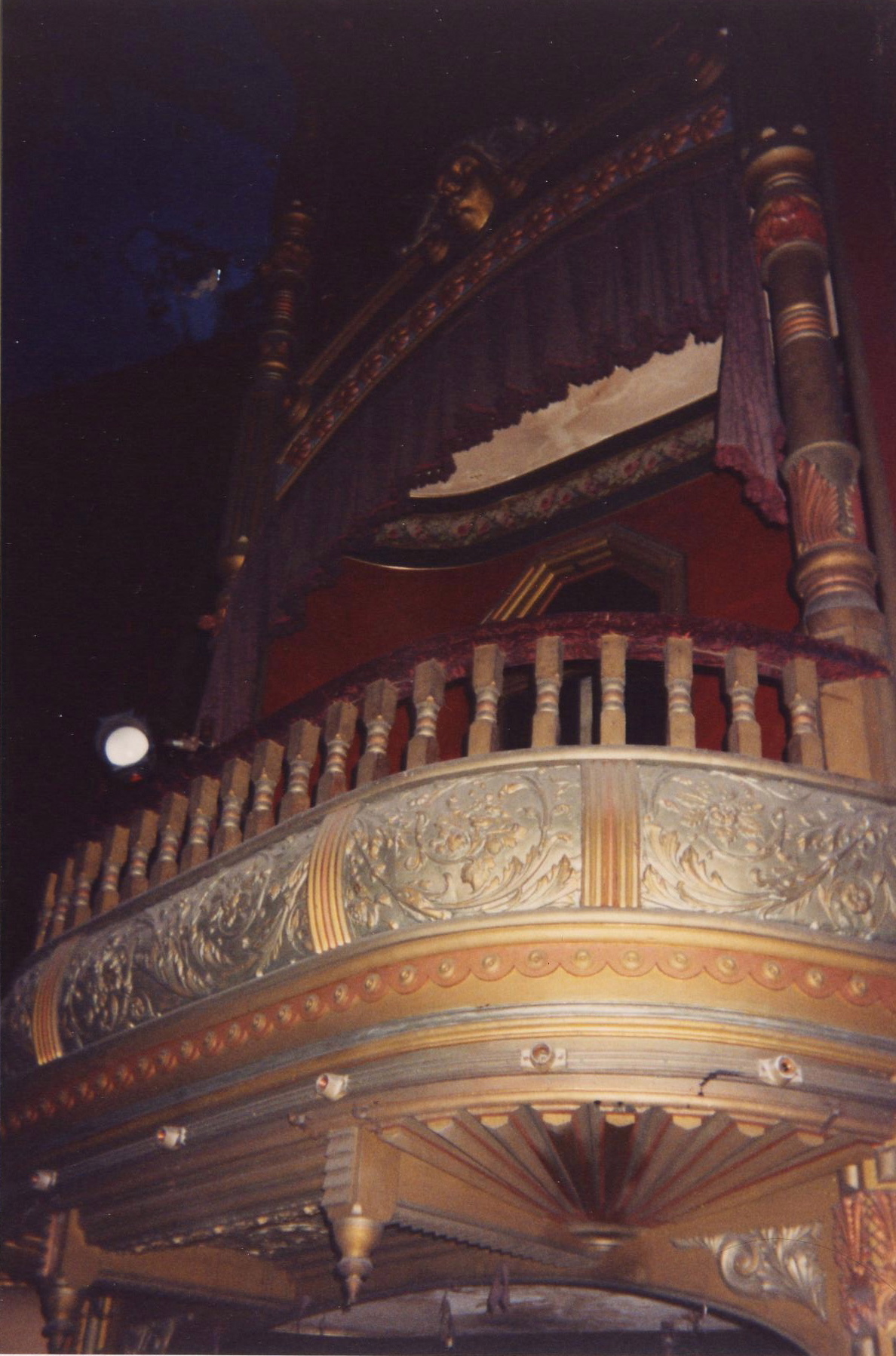
Balcony in the Grand Opera House in 1992

=== Cause for Restoration ===
In the 1960s the opera house was covered with metal siding as a part of a modernization trend, and the building lost some of its historic character. In the 1980s, part of this siding was removed. As the community was reminded of the building's original grand appearance, people organized to restore the building. Over the next two decades, local efforts to "save the Grand Opera House" and restore the adjacent Marks-Rothenberg building garnered support.

=== Funding ===
In 2000 The Riley Foundation made a $10 million grant for restoration, with a stipulation that Mississippi State University own and operate the center. The Riley Foundation donated another $2.1 million in 2005 for construction and technology upgrades. Other donations by local, state, and federal agencies followed, including a $4 million donation by Lauderdale County, a $3.6 million grant by the United States Department of Housing and Urban Development and a $3 million grant from the United States Department of Commerce, both related to urban and economic development. The project's final price tag was slightly under $25 million.

== Riley Center today ==
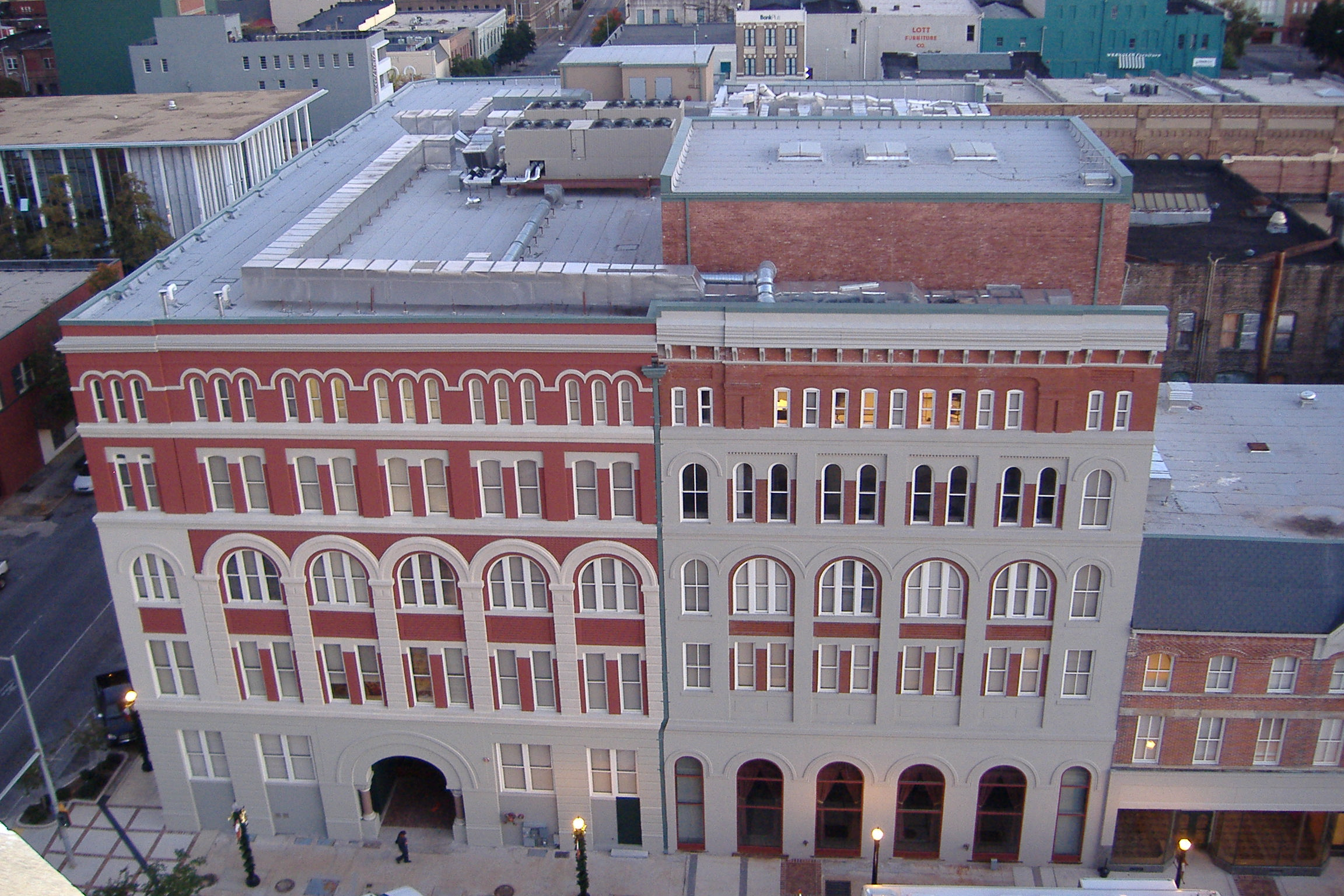
Riley Center as seen from the Threefoot Building, another historic building in Downtown Meridian

The Riley Center includes a theater which seats approximately 950 people, and a 200-seat studio theater. It also includes 30,000 sq ft (2,787 m^{2}) of meeting space for a conference center, with a large exhibit hall, break-out rooms, and board rooms.
