= Pigford Building =

- U.S. National Register of Historic Places
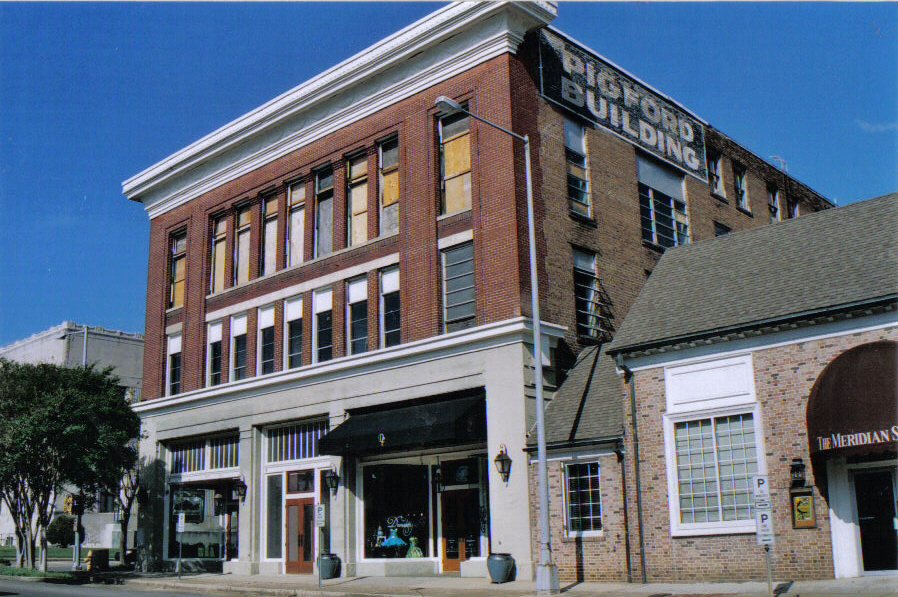
- Pigford Building in 2008

- Location within Mississippi Location within the United States
- Location: 818 22nd Ave., Meridian, Mississippi
- Coordinates: 32°21′56″N 88°42′0″W
- Built: 1915
- Architectural style: Classical Revival
- MPS: Meridian MRA
- NRHP reference No.: 79003401
- Added to NRHP: December 18, 1979

The Pigford Building, also known as Pythian Castle Hall, is a three-story red brick building in downtown Meridian, Mississippi. It was listed on the National Register of Historic Places on December 18, 1979.

== History ==
The building, constructed in 1914 by the Knights of Pythias Mount Barton Lodge No. 13, was originally known as the Pythian Castle Hall. It served as a home for the organization's weekly meetings. In the 1920s, the building was bought by Pigford Realty, who rented the building out to small businesses. Offices were located on the second floor while a ballroom occupied the third. Between 1933 and 1976, a post office and drug store owned by R.M. Hamil operated out of the first floor of the building. Other businesses have located inside the building since its construction including restaurants, beauty salons, and dress shops.

A graphic design business and tanning salon were located in the building in the 1990s, and after the business closed the entire building was gutted and renovated. A dress shop named Alexander's, owned by Debbie Moorehead, was opened in 1999, and the two upper floors of the building were closed to the public in 2000. A new dress shop named Dream It is now located on the first floor of the building and owned by Theresa Long.

== Reports of hauntings ==
The owner of the graphic design business in the building during the 1990s often worked late into the night, so she put together a small sleeping area. While she was there late at night, she reportedly heard footsteps from the second floor. Other occurrences included voices from the building's intercom system as well as a full-bodied apparition of a lady in a long white dress, which the owner's three-year-old cousin saw. The owner later saw the apparition as well and claimed that it did not like men. Objects would reportedly move across the room and doors would slam if male employees were in the building.

Employees and customers of Alexander's, the dress shop which opened in 1999, reportedly heard "a woman's ghostly laughter." Jewelry and clothes were often found lying on the floor in the mornings after having been hung or pinned up the previous night. On October 15, 1999, J.T. Mohammed, an employee of Alexander's, saw the apparition of the lady in white on the balcony. One employee, who was the only person in the store at the time, later received a phone call from an inside line, and another employee heard voices coming from an empty dressing room. Alan Brown, author of Haunted Places in the American South conducted an investigation into the hauntings in the early 2000s, during which several paranormal experiences were recorded. A door to the roof was nailed shut, clothes moved while they were untouched, and earrings appeared beside Brown's assistant's bed the next morning.

Theresa Long, owner of Dream It, and her daughter have both reported vacuum cleaners being turned on while unplugged, and many electronic devices work incorrectly while in the building. Alan Brown visited the building again in 2008 to do a study, after which he labelled the building as haunted.
