= Masonic Temple (Meridian, Mississippi) =

- U.S. National Register of Historic Places
- U.S. Historic district – Contributing property
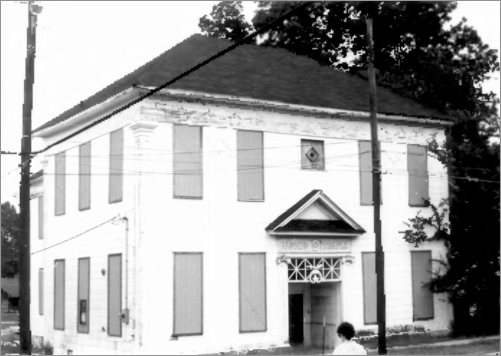
- Masonic Temple in 1987

- Location within Mississippi Location within the United States
- Location: 1220 26th Ave., Meridian, Mississippi
- Coordinates: 32°22′10″N 88°42′16″W
- Built: 1903
- Architect: Krouse & Hutchisson
- Part of: Merrehope Historic District (ID88000973)
- MPS: Meridian MRA
- NRHP reference No.: 79003395
- Added to NRHP: December 18, 1979

The Masonic Temple at 1220 26th Avenue, Meridian, Mississippi was built in 1903. It was listed on the National Register of Historic Places in 1979. It was also listed as a contributing property to the Merrehope Historic District in 1988. It has since been demolished.

The temple was owned jointly by three black fraternal lodges and stood as a tribute to the business capacity and enterprise of the black community in the city. The structure was two stories tall with a recessed entrance supported by panelled Ionic pilasters that bore the keystone of Freemasonry and the insignia of the Shriners. The effort to build the temple was largely spearheaded by T.J. Wilson.
