= Standard Drug Company (Meridian, Mississippi) =

- U.S. National Register of Historic Places
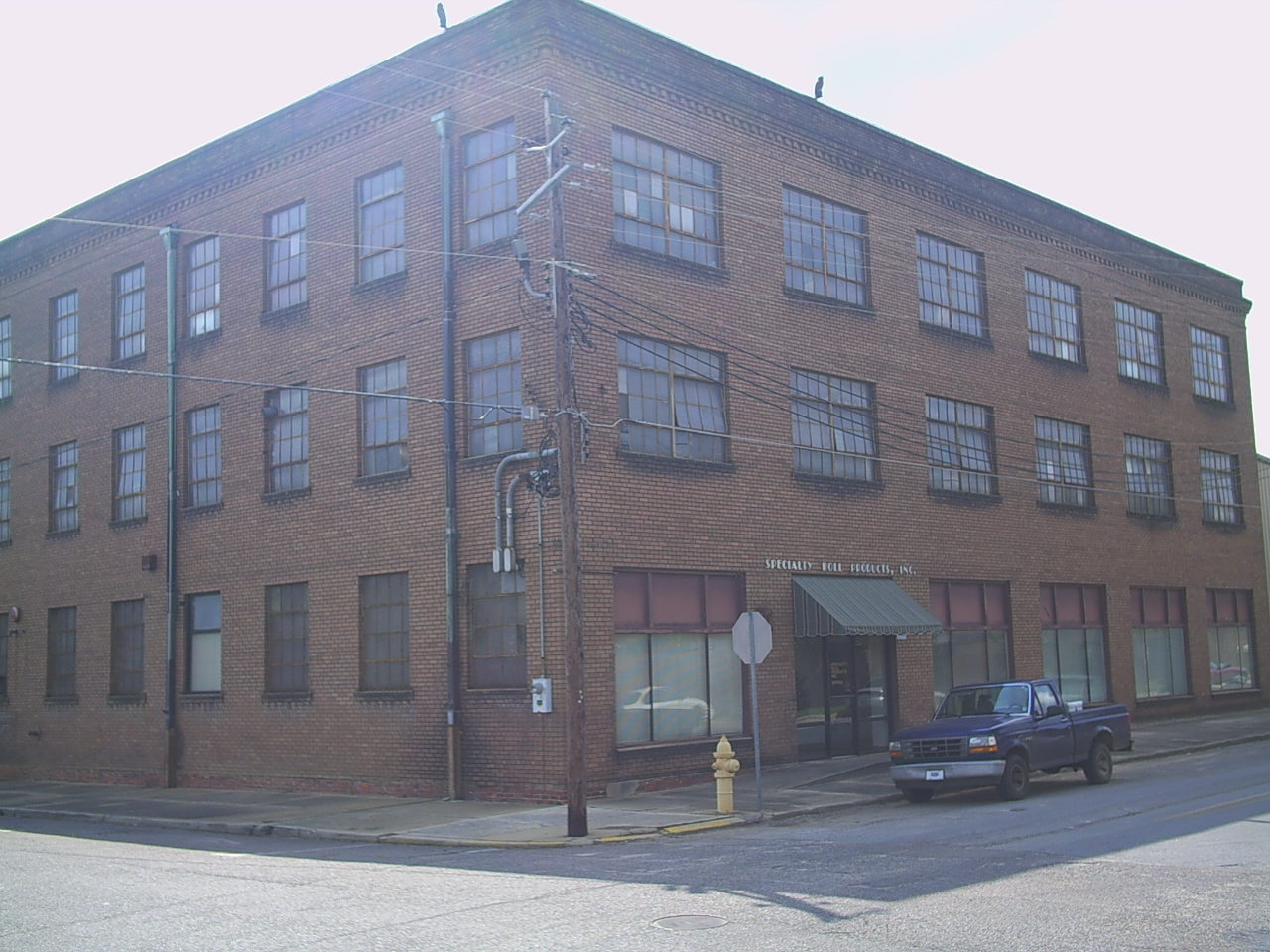
- Standard Drug Company in 2010

- Location within Mississippi Location within the United States
- Location: 601 25th Ave., Meridian, Mississippi
- Coordinates: 32°21′46″N 88°42′12″W
- Area: 1.1 acres (0.45 ha)
- Built: 1920
- Architectural style: Commercial Style
- MPS: Meridian MRA
- NRHP reference No.: 89002050
- Added to NRHP: December 7, 1989

Standard Drug Company (founded as Hopkins and Bethea) is a historic pharmaceutical company in Meridian, Mississippi. Originally established as a small retail drug store in 1900, the company was incorporated in 1919 and became one of the largest commercial firms in the city. The building was listed on the National Register of Historic Places in 1989.

== History ==
Standard Drug Company was originally named "Hopkins and Bethea" after W.E. Hopkins and Oscar Bethea, who founded the company in January 1900 on 22nd Avenue next to Weidmann's Restaurant. The company moved to a three-story building at 2408 5th Street in 1906. That building was included as a contributing property to the Meridian Urban Center Historic District in 1979, known as the "Hopkins and Bethea Building". The building had been demolished by the time the Meridian Downtown Historic District (which combined two smaller districts in Meridian, one of which was Urban Center) was listed in 2007.

As the city grew, so did Hopkins and Bethea. The business was incorporated in 1911, with W.E. Hopkins as president, and the name was changed to Standard Drug Company. "Kimborough's Antiseptic" was a popular product among locals. The product was meant to treat minor cuts and scratches, but most of its popularity was linked to the fact that it included alcohol. Another product branded by Standard Drug–Jamica ginger–was also popular for its alcoholic content during prohibition. The latter, however, left some over-users paralyzed for life with what was dubbed "Jake leg." When Bethea left the company to enroll in Tulane Medical School, a bookkeeper named Ernest A. Morrison bought into the partnership with Hopkins.

The company continued to grow, and by 1919, the company was large enough to warrant a new building. The Meridian Medical College property at 25th Avenue and 6th Street was purchased and demolished, making way for a new three-story building with over 67,300 square feet (6,250 m^{2}) of floor space. In the early 1910s, the company began diversifying and added other products such as cosmetics, school supplies, and children's toys to their profit margin. During World War I, when the rest of the country was experiencing a shortage of quinine (used to treat malaria), Standard Drug was able to keep a steady supply, which allowed them to remain in business and make a great deal of money.

When Hopkins died in 1941, Morrison took over as president of the company, appointing J.L. Hopkins (W.E. Hopkins's son) as vice president and his own son, Edgar H. Morrison, secretary and treasurer. When Morrison died in 1959, J.L. Hopkins took over, and when Hopkins died, Edgar Morrison took over. Edgar Morrison was the final president of the company, presiding over its sell and transfer to Durr-Fillauer Medical out of Montgomery, Alabama.

== Standard Drug Company building ==
The building at 601 25th Avenue, built in 1919, was listed on the National Register of Historic Places in 1989. The building has a utilitarian design, simple and rectangular, a style common to commercial and industrial buildings of its construction era. The southeast corner of the building, which faces the intersection of 6th Street and 25th Avenue, is constructed of yellow-brown brick with a decorative cornice while the "rear" (north and west sides) of the building is constructed of lower grade red brick. A parking lot is located on the rear side. One loading dock is located on the south side of the building, and another (added in the 1970s) is located on the northeast side of the building.

The first floor contains three rooms, and all of the walls are stuccoed. From east to west, the rooms were used for office space and product display, shipping and receiving, and storage. The office room was originally floored with linoleum, although carpet was added later. The room was originally only split into two areas, the office area having a pressed tin ceiling, but a vault was added in the 1920s, and a private office was partitioned off in 1941. A computer room was later built in the southeast corner. The shipping and receiving room contains an elevator in the center of the room which leads to the upper floors. Loading docks are located on either side of the room. The storage room is empty except for staircases leading to the upper floors.

The second floor was only partitioned into two rooms. Milk of magnesia, iodine, merthiolate, mercurochrome, and other drugs were manufactured in the east room while the west room was used mainly for storage. A small corner of the west room was known as the "acid room"; the floor was covered with sand to prevent damage. The third floor was primarily used for storage.
