= List of African-American historic places in Mississippi =

This list of African American Historic Places in Mississippi is based on a book by the National Park Service, The Preservation Press, the National Trust for Historic Preservation, and the National Conference of State Historic Preservation Officers.

Some of these sites are on the National Register of Historic Places (NR) as independent sites or as part of a larger historic district. Several of the sites are National Historic Landmarks (NRL). Others have Mississippi historical markers (HM). The citation on historical markers is given in the reference. The location listed is the nearest community to the site. More precise locations are given in the reference.

== Adams County ==
- Natchez
  - China Grove Plantation
  - Glen Aubin
  - Oakland
  - Pine Ridge Church
  - Smith-Bontura-Evans House
  - William Johnson House

== Alcorn County ==
- Alcorn
  - Oakland Chapel

== Bolivar County ==
- Mound Bayou
  - I.T. Montgomery House

== Claiborne County ==
- Port Gibson
  - Golden West Cemetery

== Hancock County ==
- Bay St. Louis
  - Beach Boulevard Historic District
  - Sycamore Street Historic District
  - Washington Street Historic District

== Harrison County ==
- Biloxi
  - Pleasant Reed Home

== Hinds County ==
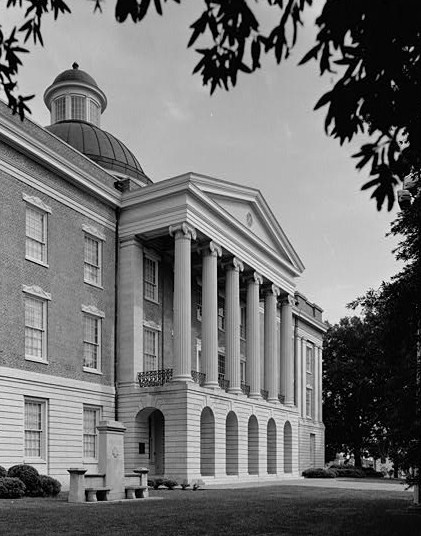
Old State Capitol

- Jackson
  - Alex Williams House
  - Ayer Hall
  - Farish Street Neighborhood Historic District
  - Mississippi State Capitol
  - Smith Robertson Elementary School,
  - West Capitol Street Historic District
- Tougaloo
  - John W. Boddie House

== Jackson County ==
- Ocean Springs
  - Thomas Isaac Keys House

== Jefferson County ==
- Lorman
  - Alcorn State University Historic District

== Jefferson Davis County ==
- Prentiss
  - 1907 House

== Lauderdale County ==
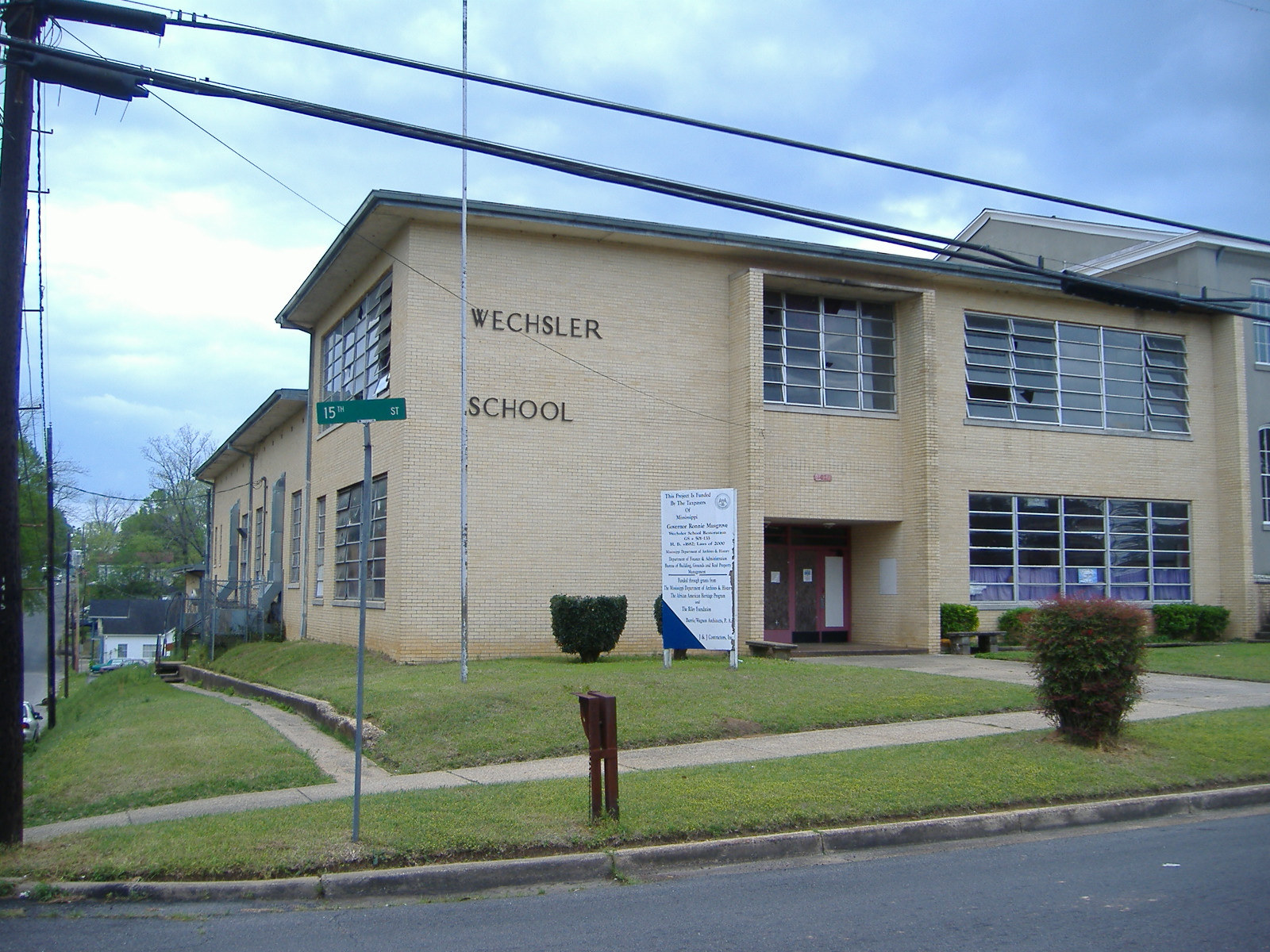
The school was the first brick public school building in Mississippi built with public funds for African-American children.

- Meridian
  - Carnegie Branch Library
  - Masonic Temple
  - Meridian Baptist Seminary
  - Merrehope Historic District
  - Wechsler School

== Leflore County ==
- Greenwood
  - Wesley Memorial Methodist Episcopal

== Marshall County ==
- Holly Springs
  - Mississippi Industrial College Historic District
  - Oakview
  - Sprires Bolling House

== Monroe County ==
- Aberdeen
  - South Central Aberdeen Historic District

== Oktibbeha County ==
- Starkville
  - Odd Fellows Cemetery

== Warren County ==
- Vicksburg
  - Beulah Cemetery
