= Congregation Beth Israel (Meridian, Mississippi) =

Reform Jewish congregation in Mississippi, US

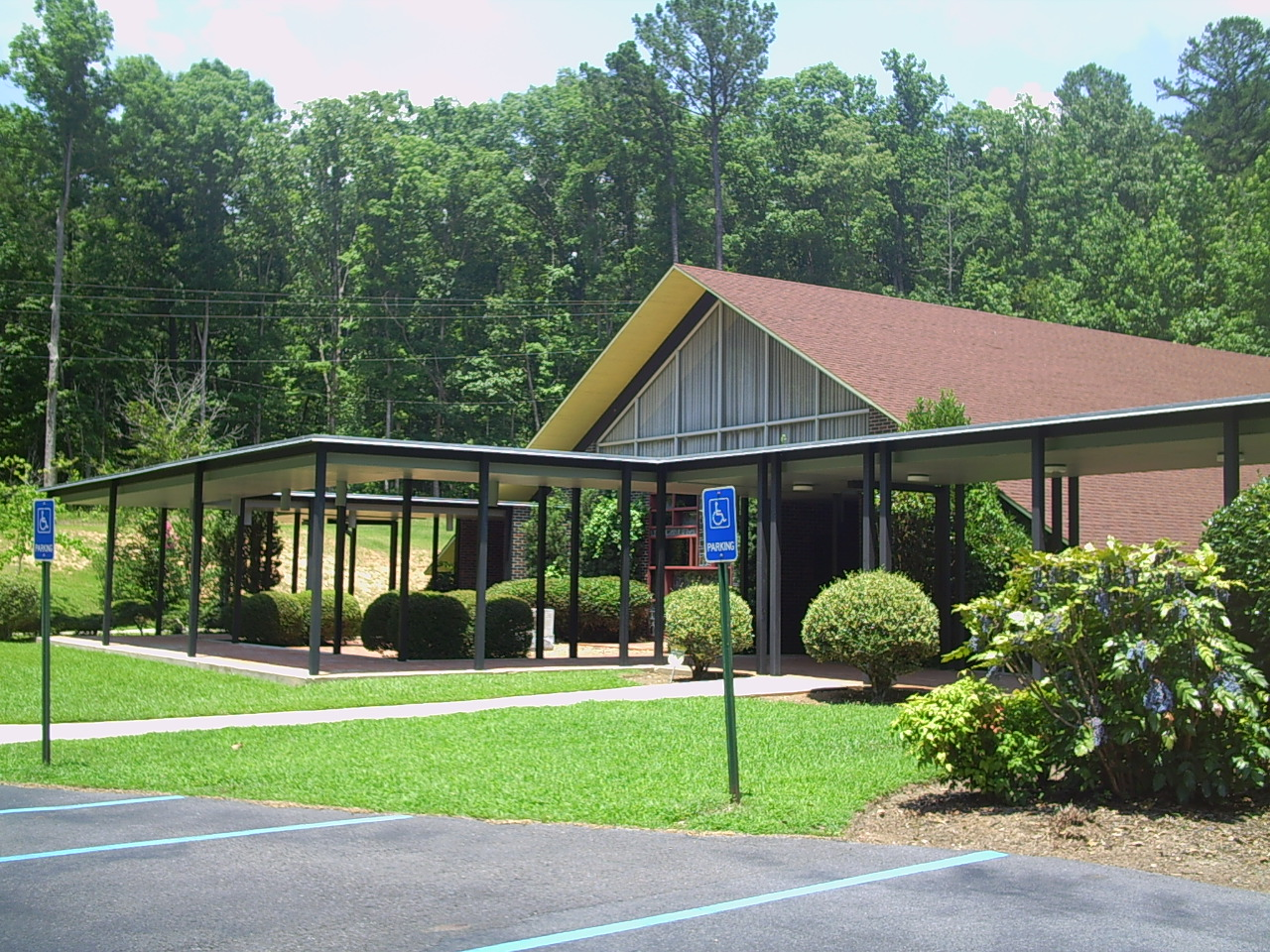
- Temple Beth Israel in 2010, from the southwest

- Location in Mississippi

Religion
- Affiliation: Reform Judaism
- Ecclesiastical or organisational status: Synagogue
- Leadership: Rabbi Barry Altman (part-time)
- Status: Active

Location
- Location: 57th Circuit and 14th Avenue, Meridian, Mississippi
- Country: United States
- Coordinates: 32°25′14″N 88°41′31″W

Architecture
- Established: 1868 (as a congregation)
- Completed: 1879 (22nd Avenue); 1906 (11th Street); 1964 (57th Ct. and 14th Ave)

Website
- congregationbethisraelmeridianms.blogspot.com

Congregation Beth Israel is a Reform Jewish congregation and synagogue, located in Meridian, Mississippi, in the United States. Founded in 1868 and a member of the Union for Reform Judaism, the congregation's first permanent house of worship was a Middle Eastern-style building constructed in 1879. The congregation moved to another building built in the Greek Revival style in 1906, and in 1964 moved to a more modern building, out of which they still operate.

The congregation was initially made up of only ten families but grew to include 50 members by 1878. By the time their second building was built in 1906, the congregation included 82 members, and Meridian as a whole had grown to include 525 Jewish residents by 1927. By the 2000s there were fewer than forty, mostly elderly Jews remaining in the city, however, and the congregation no longer has a full-time rabbi. Former rabbis include Judah Wechsler, after whom the Wechsler school was named, and William Ackerman, whose wife Paula Ackerman became the first woman to perform rabbinical duties in the country after her husband's unexpected death.

In 1968, the education building of the new complex was bombed by members of the Ku Klux Klan. Pieces of glass were salvaged from the destruction and are now incorporated into the front windows of the current synagogue building. The congregation owns and maintains a historic cemetery at 19th Street and 15th Avenue which was listed on the National Register of Historic Places in 1989.

== History ==
In the early days of Lauderdale County before Meridian was established, the nearby town of Marion was the largest settlement in the area. The families of Abraham Threefoot, Isaac Rosenbaum, Leopold Rosenbaum, E. Lowenstein, and Jacob Cohen lived in Marion during these early years. These families, along with other Jews in Marion, worked with Jews from the up-and-coming Meridian to build a temple halfway between the two towns. After the American Civil War, Meridian began to grow rapidly and Marion began to decline. As a result, many of Marion's Jews elected to move to Meridian. In 1868, the Jewish community established the first Jewish congregation in Lauderdale County, Beth Israel, and bought the lot which is now the Beth Israel Cemetery for $100 (today $2,000).

=== First synagogue building ===
The congregation initially consisted of only ten families and met in several temporary locations before moving to a permanent building. These locations included a house on 24th Avenue and 9th Street, a room above Carney's Grocery Store, and Sheehan Hall. In this interim period, the congregation grew to include 50 members by 1878, with David Burgheim serving as rabbi. The Middle Eastern style building at the corner of 8th Street and 22nd Avenue, constructed by the growing congregation in 1879, was the first building in the city with gas-powered lighting. Rabbi Burgheim was succeeded by Rabbi W. Weinstein, then Rabbi Jacobs, and then Rabbi Judah Wechsler. Wechsler, who became rabbi in 1887, led a movement to provide public schools for blacks, which culminated in a bond issue to construct the first brick public school building for African Americans in the state. The Wechsler School was named after him and has since been listed on the National Register of Historic Places and as a Mississippi Landmark. The congregation stayed in this building for several years, before eventually being forced to move due to complaints of flies attracted by horse droppings outside of a nearby retail store.

=== Second synagogue building ===
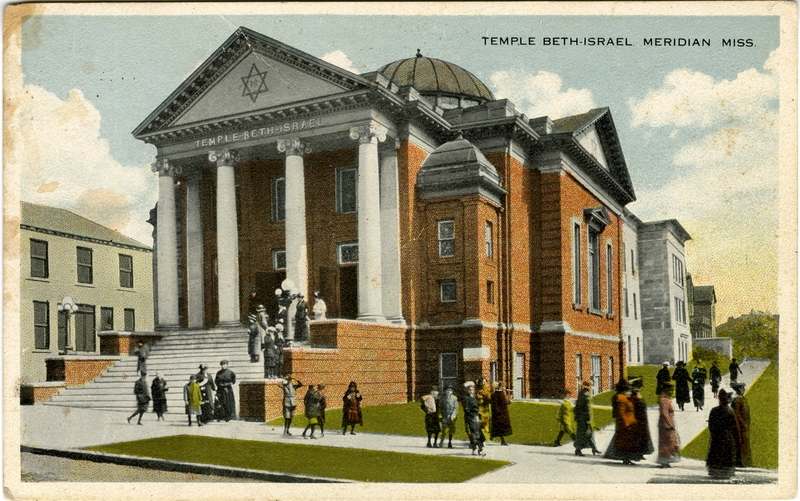
Postcard of Beth Israel's temple used from 1906 to 1964

In 1906, a new Greek Revival octagonal synagogue designed by architect P.J. Krouse and modelled after the Temple of Athena Nike was built at the corner of 11th Street and 24th Avenue. The marble steps leading to the entrance of the building were flanked by large Ionic columns. The new synagogue could seat 500 and featured stained glass windows displaying the Ten Commandments, a menorah, the Star of David, and Noah's Ark. A fire damaged the building during its first year of operation, and while it was being repaired, services were held at St. Paul's Episcopal Church. By 1907, the congregation had grown to include 82 members and was led by Rabbi Max Raisin. By 1927, the Jewish community in Meridian had grown to 525 people, partly due to an influx of immigrants from Eastern Europe. The members of Beth Israel sponsored these newcomers, helping them to find jobs and homes and holding night classes to teach them English.

Some of the congregation's members had preferred a more strict form of worship and a smaller Orthodox congregation, Ohel Jacob, had been formed in 1895. The two congregations had good relations, however, and a number of Meridian Jews belonged to both.

In 1951, the congregation included 100 members and was the second largest Jewish community in the state. When Rabbi William Ackerman, who had served the congregation from 1924 to 1950, suddenly died while still in service, Beth Israel asked his wife Paula Ackerman to take his place until they could find a replacement. No women had been ordained at this time, and it would be a full 20 more years before the first woman would be officially ordained in the United States. Nonetheless, without ordination Paula Ackerman served as "spiritual leader" (the congregation elected not to call her "rabbi") for three years until Beth Israel could find another. Despite the unwillingness to call Ackerman "rabbi," she performed all the duties of a normal rabbi, including conducting weekly Shabbat services, giving sermons, and performing marriages and funerals. In spite of much media attention and criticism from other Jews in the country, the congregation remained united under her leadership. (Ackerman would later move to her original home of Pensacola, Florida, where she would serve as an interim rabbi at Temple Beth-El for nine months in 1962 until a replacement was found.)

=== Third synagogue building ===
By 1964, the temple was in need of repairs, and some older members found it difficult to get up the steep marble steps at the entrance. Instead of repairing their 60-year-old building in downtown, they purchased a 5-acre (2.0 ha) plot in the Broadmoor residential subdivision of Meridian and built a new synagogue. The new facility, located at 57th Court and 14th Avenue, was dedicated in December 1964 and was composed of a 200-seat sanctuary, a social hall with a kitchen and a library, and an education building.

==== 1968 Ku Klux Klan bombing ====
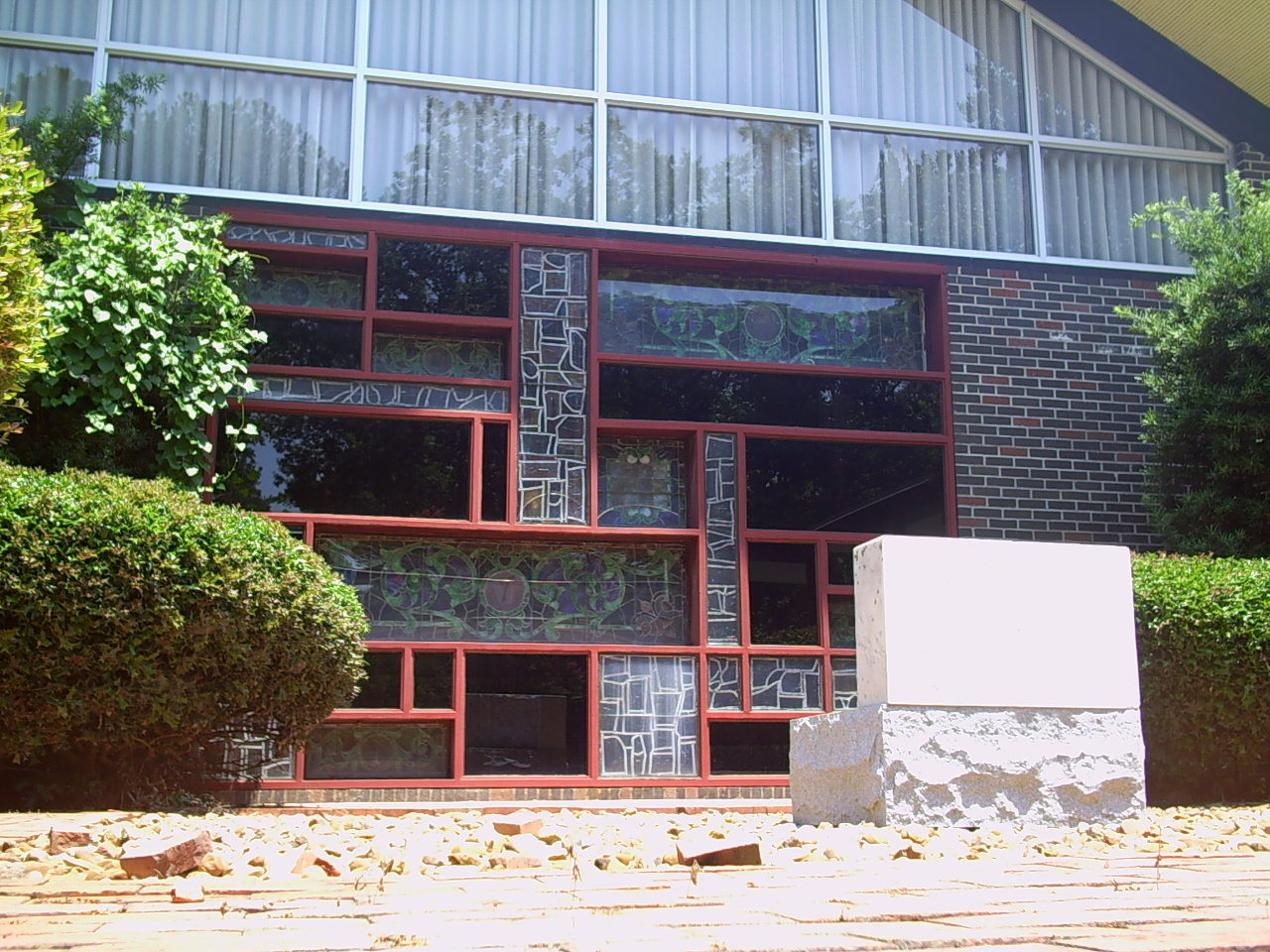
Front windows (west facade) of current synagogue, which contain glass from former education building, bombed in 1968

During the American Civil Rights Movement in the 1960s, the leadership of Beth Israel spoke out against the Ku Klux Klan's attacks on black churches. In response, Thomas Albert Tarrants III (born December 20, 1946) of Mobile, Alabama, who had helped bomb the synagogue building of Beth Israel Congregation and its rabbi's house there bombed Beth Israel's education building on May 28, 1968. The blast was caused by about 15 sticks of dynamite planted by Tarrants and his accomplice, Danny Joe Hawkins, a top hitman in the White Knights of the Ku Klux Klan. The force of the blast knocked down several walls of the education building and caved in part of the roof while also destroying a door at the opposite end of the synagogue building. A hole approximately 24 inches (61 cm) in diameter was left in the concrete floor, and damages were estimated to be around $50,000 (equivalent to $463,000 today). A reward of $10,000 was offered by the Meridian City Council, and $15,000 extra was promised by the Jewish community of the city. According to Sammy Feltenstein, past president of Congregation Beth Israel, pieces of stained glass that survived the bombing were salvaged and adorn the front window of the synagogue today.

On June 30, Tarrants returned to Meridian to bomb the home of Meyer Davidson, an outspoken leader of the Jewish community, on 29th Avenue. FBI chief special agent Roy K. Moore and Meridian police chief C. L. “Roy” Gunn (1904–1976) convinced Raymond and Alton Wayne Roberts, local Klan members, to gather information about the Klan's operations. Alton was free on bond after being convicted in connection with the murders of Chaney, Goodman, and Schwerner in 1964. Leaders of the Jewish communities in Jackson and in Meridian had raised money to pay the two informants, who tipped off the FBI about the attack before it happened. Fifteen police officers, led by Meridian police officer Thomas E. Tucker, were hidden around Davidson's house shortly after midnight when a car stopped about 50 feet (15 m) away from the house. Tarrants exited the vehicle with a box, later found to include 29 sticks of dynamite, and approached Davidson's carport. When police ordered him to stop, he dropped the box and fled to his vehicle. Officers then chased him for about 15 blocks before ramming the back of his vehicle, ending the chase. Tarrants opened fire on the policemen with a German-made 9mm submachine gun, striking Meridian police officer Joseph Michael Hatcher four times in the chest (though critically injured, the officer survived). Tarrants fled through the neighborhood continuing to fire at the policemen. U.S. Navy Machinist's Mate Second Class Robert E. Burton, a resident of the neighborhood, opened his door to see what was going on and was struck by stray bullets. Police eventually found Tarrants in a pool of his own blood in a local resident's backyard. Kathy Ainsworth, a 26-year-old fifth grade school teacher from Jackson who had helped with the bombing of Jackson's synagogue a few months earlier, was found dead in the car with a loaded pistol in her purse. The car's owner was identified to be Danny Joe Hawkins, who had helped bomb Beth Israel; he was arrested on robbery charges a few weeks later. Tarrants survived his wounds and was sentenced to a thirty-year term in Parchman prison. He was paroled eight years into his term to enter the University of Mississippi after a religious conversion, and in 1992 he was training missionaries in North Carolina.

== Cemetery ==
- Beth Israel Cemetery
- U.S. National Register of Historic Places
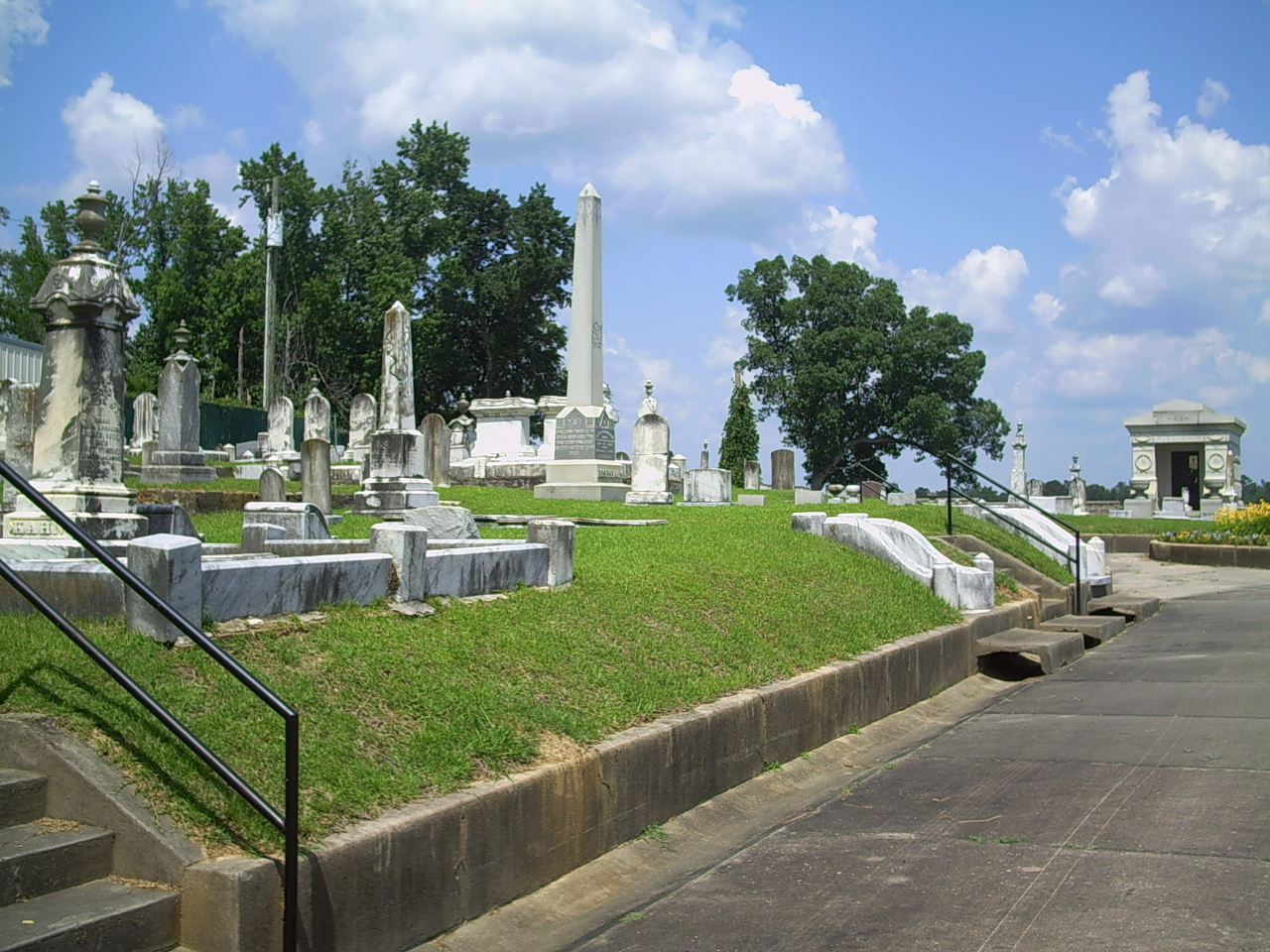
- Beth Israel Cemetery in 2010
- Location: 19th Street and 5th Avenue, Meridian, Mississippi
- Coordinates: 32°22′38″N 88°40′57″W
- Area: 2.9 acres (1.2 ha)
- Built: c. 1868–70
- MPS: Meridian MRA
- NRHP reference No.: 89000169
- Added to NRHP: March 22, 1989

Besides their main campus in Broadmoor, the congregation also operates Beth Israel Cemetery, listed on the National Register of Historic Places in 1989. Located at 19th Street and 5th Avenue, it was originally outside of Meridian's city limits and was intended to be a rural cemetery, but the city has since expanded and annexed the area containing the cemetery. The cemetery contains generations of German and Alsatian immigrants, as well as many big names of the largely mercantile Jewish community of the late nineteenth and early twentieth centuries. Beth Israel Cemetery is the only remaining built memorial for many of Meridian's early Jews since the era of the 1879 and 1906 temple buildings, neither of which still stands.

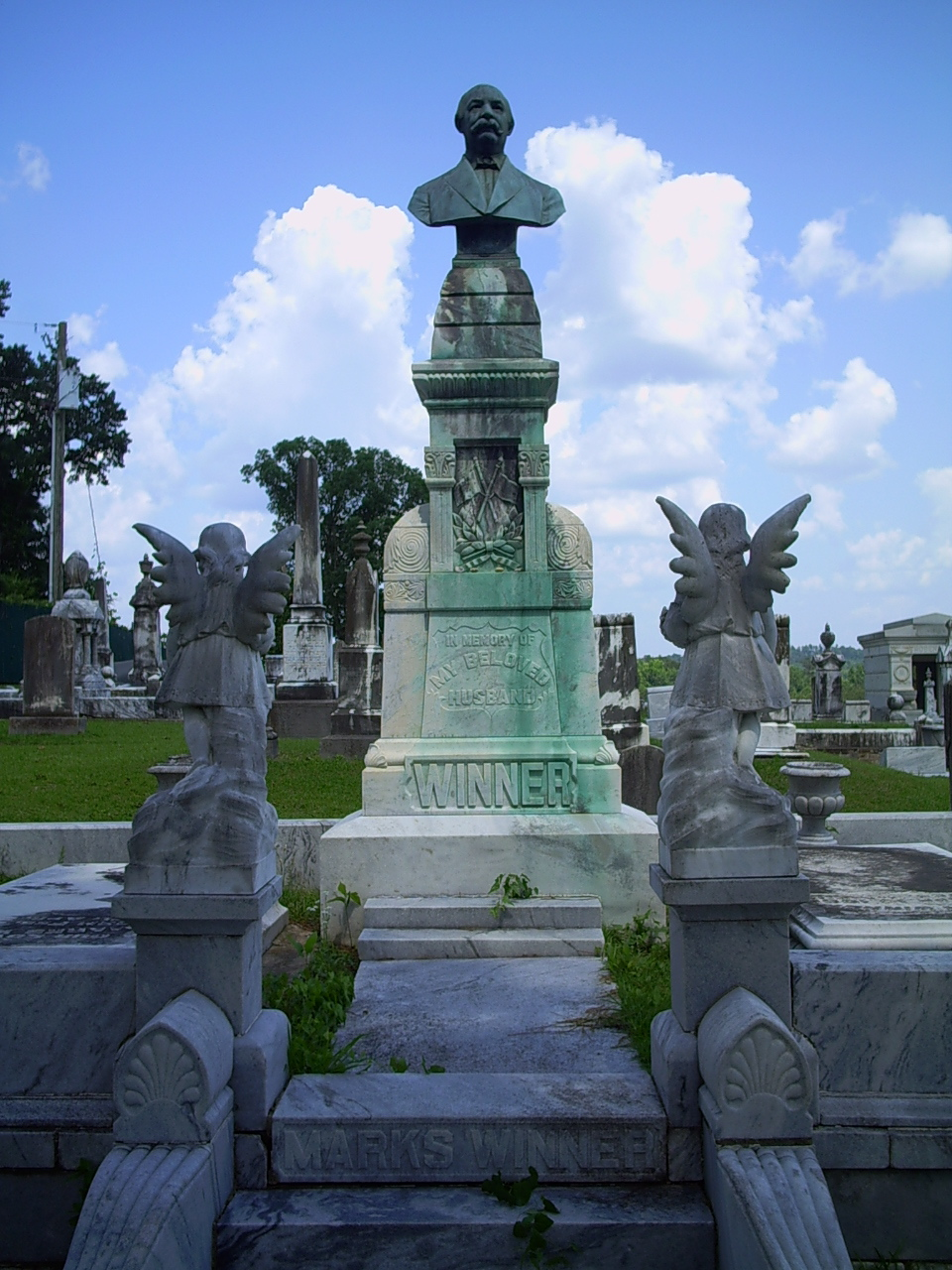
Winner Monument

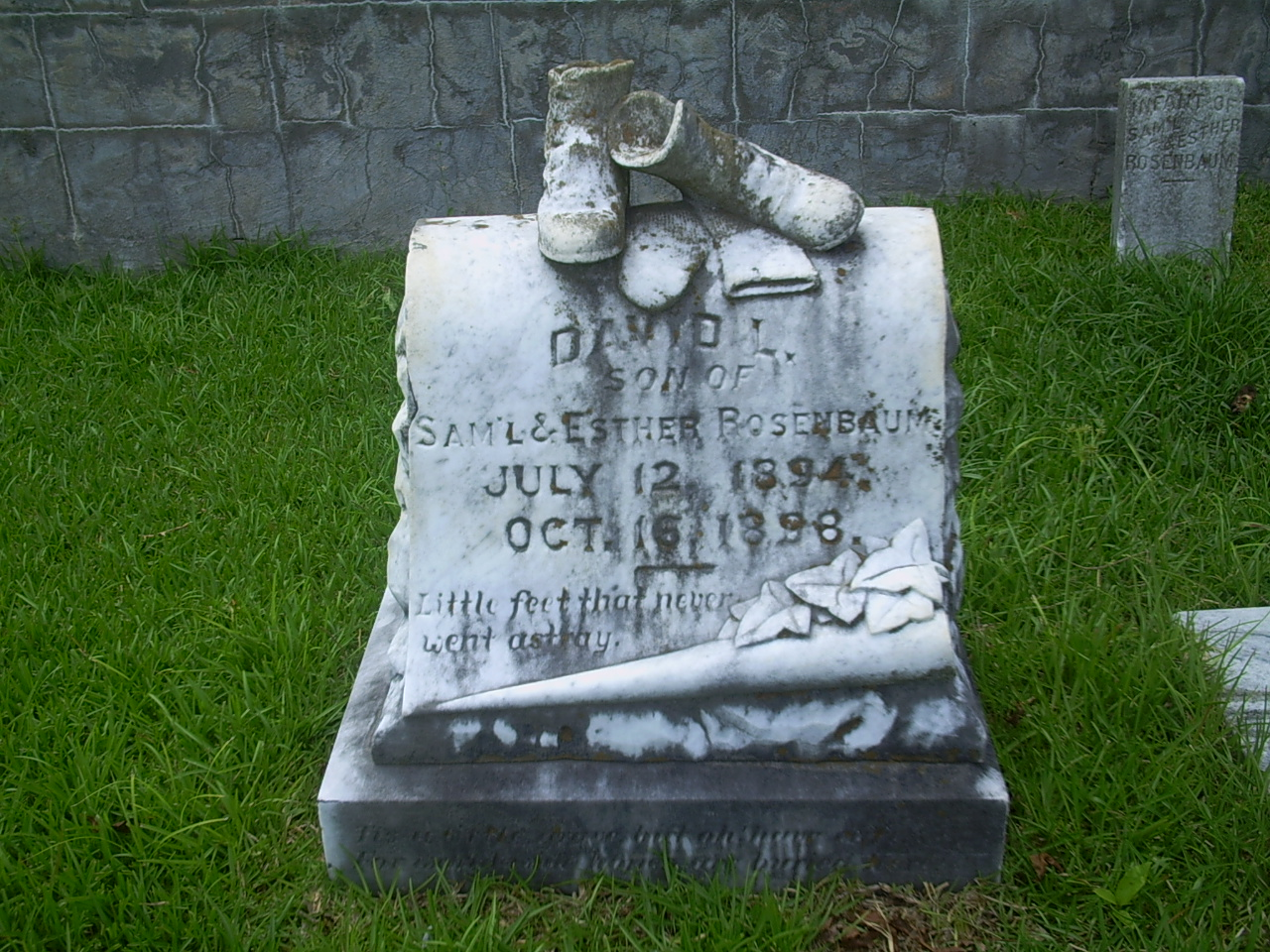
Rosenbaum grave with marble shoes and stockings

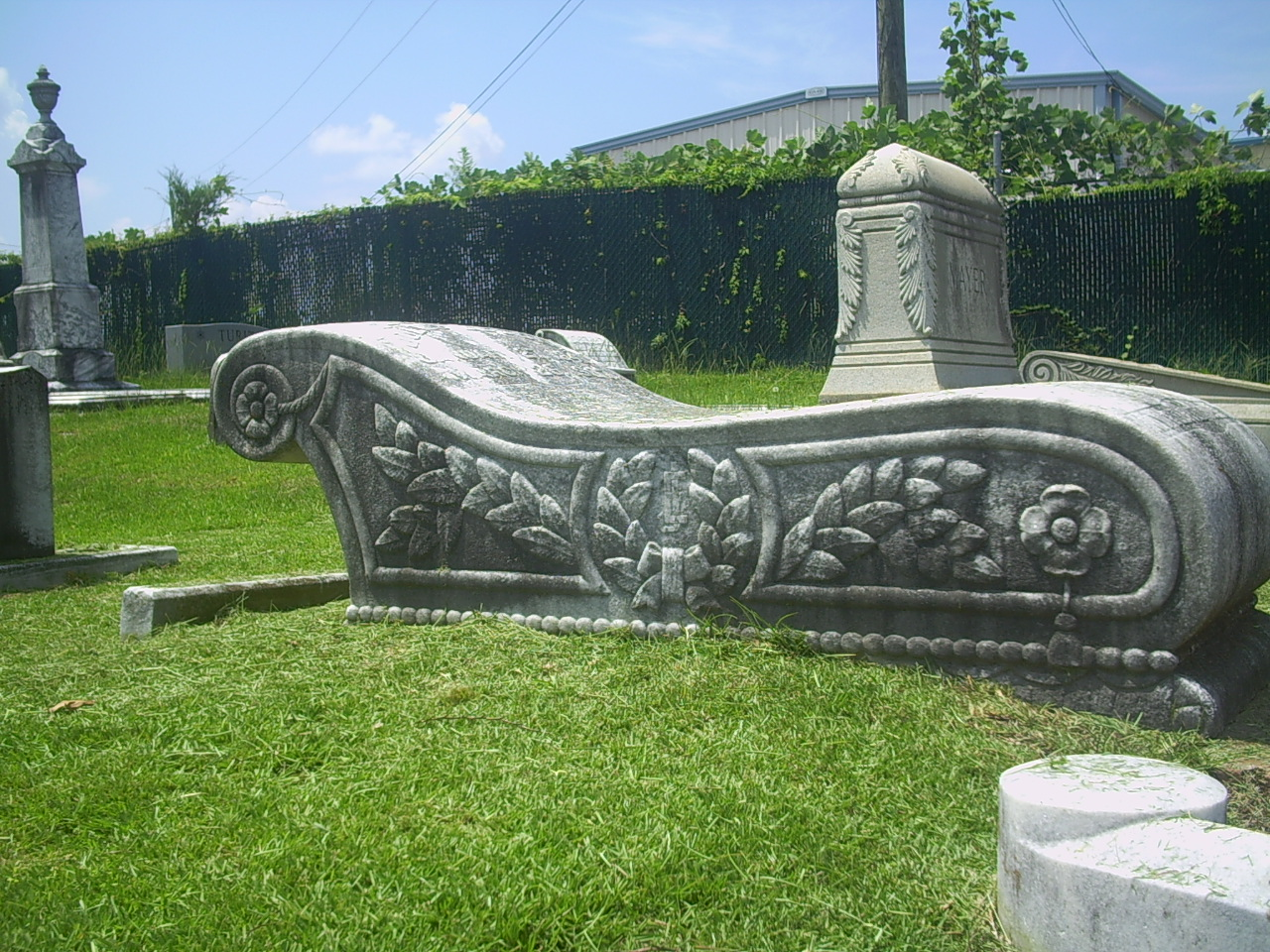
Elson fainting couch

A stuccoed brick fence with cast iron gates and an iron Star of David enclose the cemetery. Within the walls, there are two main pathways which meet in the center of the cemetery at a circular decorative piece including a fountain. The oldest graves are in the northern half of the cemetery while newer graves were added progressively south. Many grave sites are adorned with well-maintained Victorian era funerary art, which gives the cemetery its historic significance. Among the monuments include the grave enclosure of the Winner family, which includes a bronze bust of Mark Winner, and two marble angels at the entrance of the plot. Other examples include the grave of David L. Rosenbaum, topped with marble shoes and stockings, the grave of Julius Elson, marked by a carved marble fainting couch, and a memorial to Mattimore Meyer, featuring a marble angel.

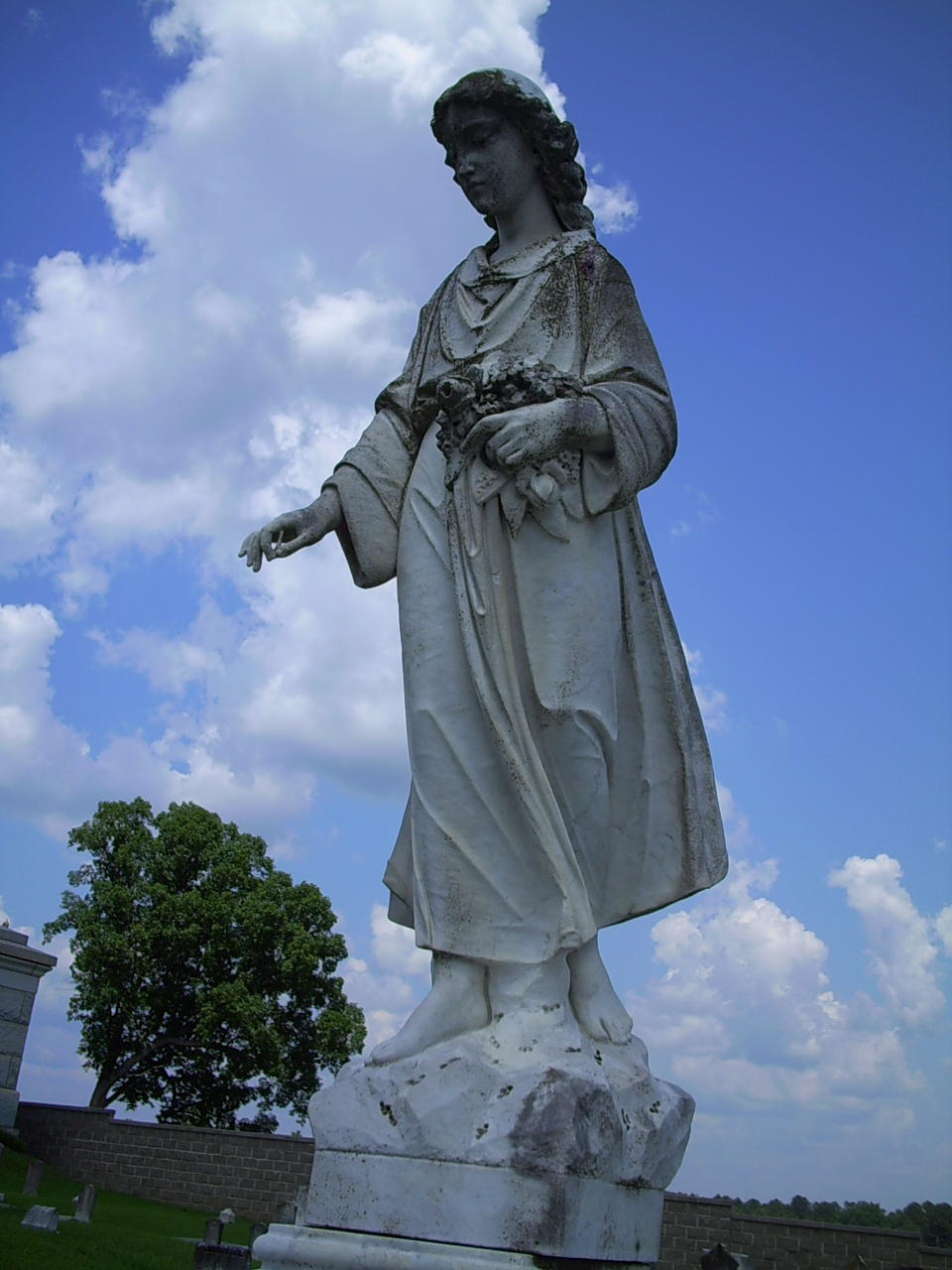
Meyer angel

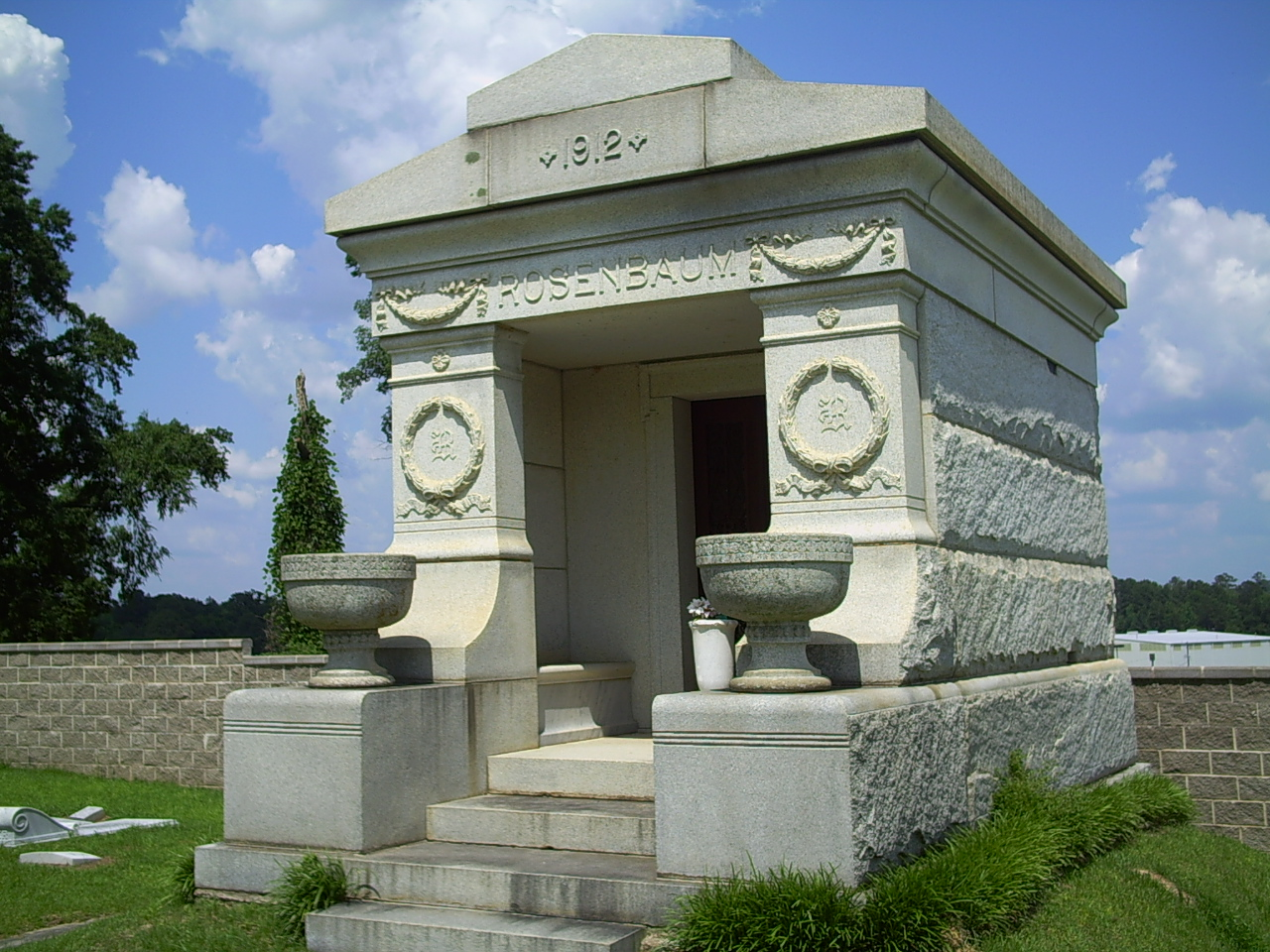
Rosenbaum Mausoleum

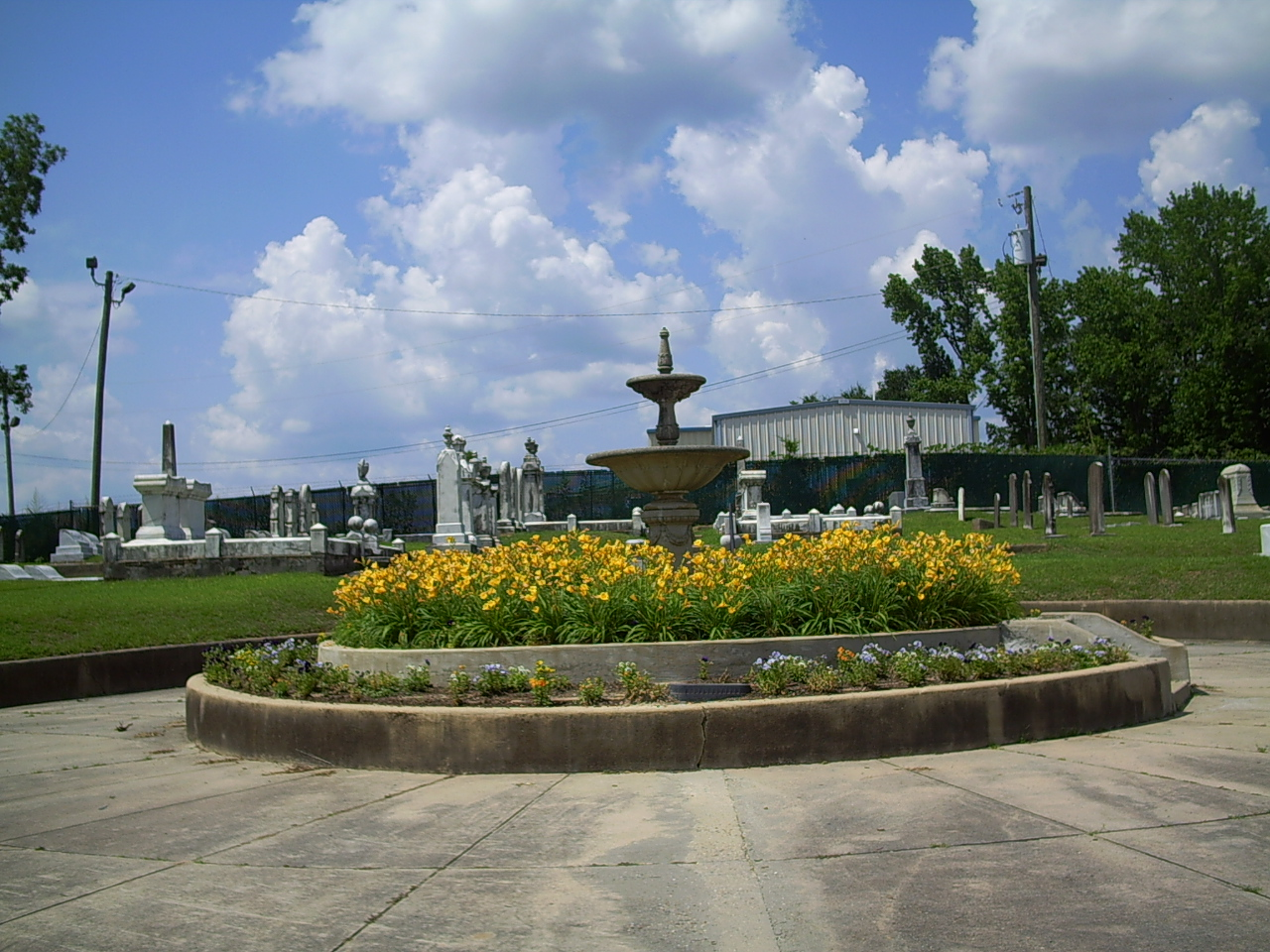
Decorative centerpiece

Because the cemetery is so small – only 2.9 acres (1.2 ha) – it cannot be fully compared to such prolific rural cemeteries as Mount Auburn Cemetery in Massachusetts, but it was clearly laid out in the rural cemetery fashion. Many of the first people buried here were European immigrants, so that could explain why there are no trees on the property. Jewish cemeteries in Europe are generally not planted with trees because of the possibility that roots could disturb the bodies.

== Decline of the Jewish community ==
Congregation Beth Israel experienced decline along with the rest of the city and state's Jewish community. The Jewish population in Mississippi peaked in 1927 at 6,420 and has since decreased steadily. By 2001, only 1,500 Jews remained in the state. Children of the original Jewish immigrants – mostly merchants – were more interested in going to college to become professionals than taking over family businesses. The rise of national retail chains pressured many Jews to move to larger cities, leaving empty storefronts to line streets of smaller cities that were once economic centers. As of 2006, there were thirteen Jewish congregations left in the state, and only two still had a full-time rabbi. Meridian as a whole has also seen a decline in population. Between the censuses in 1980 and 2000, the city's population declined over 16% from 46,577 to 39,968.

By the early 21st century, there were fewer than 40 Jews remaining in the city of Meridian, most of whom were elderly. Ohel Jacob, the local Orthodox congregation, first shared services with Beth Israel on all but High Holy Days and then disbanded completely in 1990, with its handful of members joining Beth Israel. By the 2000s, there were no longer enough children in the Beth Israel congregation to support a Sunday school class or youth group. Beth Israel no longer has a full-time rabbi; instead, from 2005 to 2016 retired Rabbi David Goldstein from Touro Synagogue in New Orleans, leads services once a month. Starting September 2016, Rabbi Barry Altman, of Ormond Beach, Florida, took over as part-time rabbi. The synagogue serves about 20 member families and houses a Family Growth Services Group, which "seeks to sustain and advance the reach and contributions of the Jewish community within Meridian." In January 2010, Beth Israel launched a Family Relocation Program, which provided grants of up to $25,000 to families looking to relocate to the Meridian area.
