= Wechsler School =

- U.S. National Register of Historic Places
- Mississippi Landmark
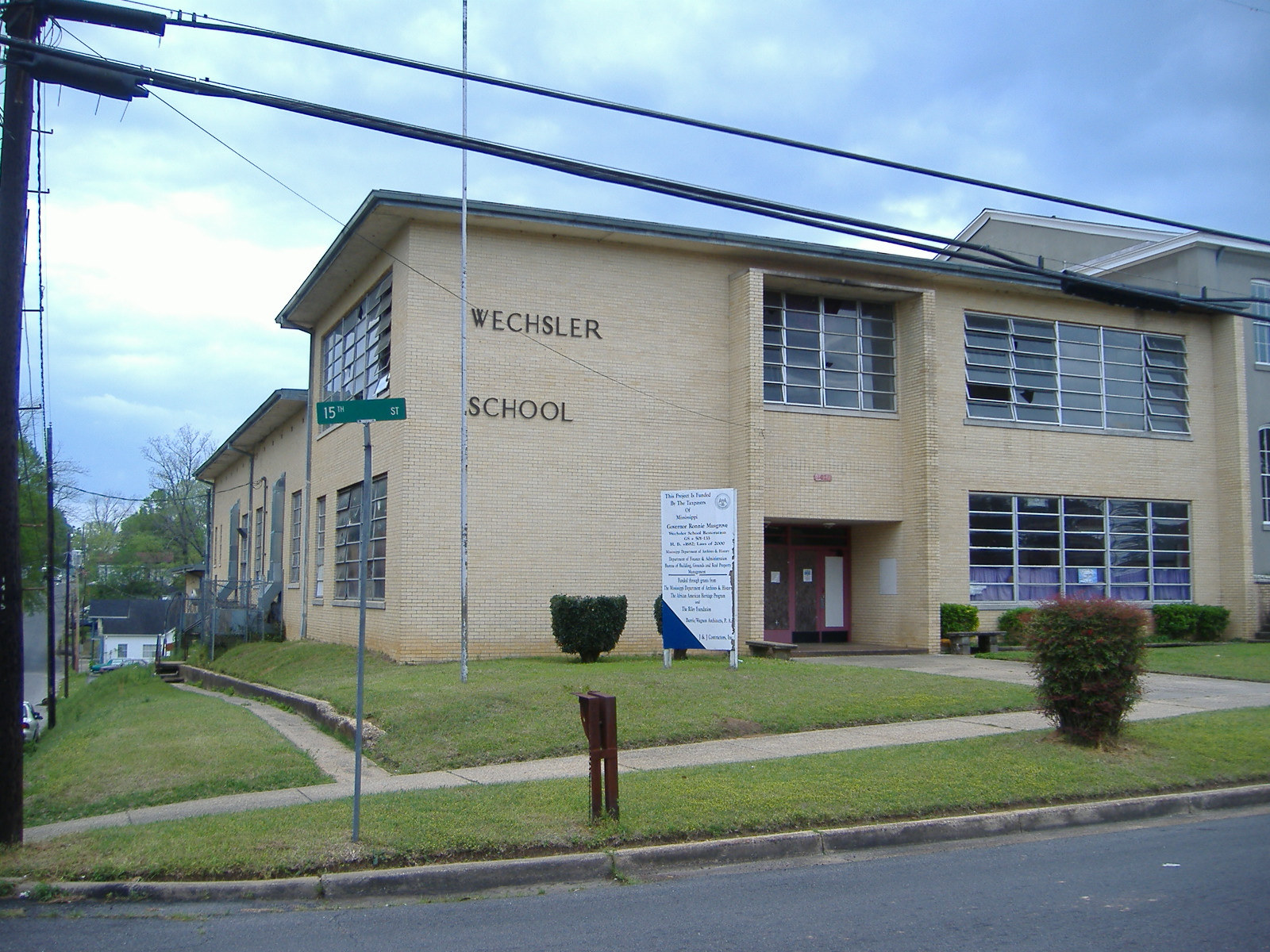
- Unrestored section of Wechsler School

- Location within Mississippi Location within the United States
- Location: Meridian, Mississippi
- Coordinates: 32°22′17″N 88°42′33″W
- Built: 1894
- Architect: Multiple
- Architectural style: Italianate
- NRHP reference No.: 91000880
- USMS No.: 075-MER-0186-NR-ML

Significant dates
- Added to NRHP: July 15, 1991
- Designated USMS: January 22, 1993

Wechsler School is a historic school in Meridian, Mississippi erected in 1894. The school was the first brick public school building in Mississippi built with public funds for African-American children. It originally served primary through eighth grades but was later expanded to include high school as well. The school was named in honor of Rabbi Judah Wechsler of Congregation Beth Israel, who had led and inspired Meridian public to approve a bond issue to raise money for construction of the school. The school was listed on the National Register of Historic Places in 1991 and designated a Mississippi Landmark in 1993.

== History ==
=== Original 1894 building ===
Early public education in Meridian was based on the 1870 Mississippi Constitution. From 1870 to 1885, trustees appointed by the City Council served on the Board of School Directors, which had authority to operate the schools. The first public school for African Americans in the city was held in facilities rented from St. Paul Methodist Church. The Mississippi legislature amended the city charter in January 1888 to allow the city to maintain its own municipal school district, and in March of the same year $30,000 in bonds was approved for the city to build new public schools.

In 1894 when Wechsler was built, 30% of the children in the city were African American. Because of this growing number, $15,000 was used to purchase the grounds on which the building now stands. After the bond was approved in February 1894, the school was named after Rabbi Judah Wechsler, formerly of Congregation Beth Israel, who had helped raise interest in building the school. Though the first brick school for African Americans in the state of Mississippi was Union School in Natchez, Mississippi built in 1872, Wechsler School became the first brick public school built for African Americans in Mississippi with public funding.

The original building was a two-story Italianate building. The first floor contained six rooms while the second floor consisted of two rooms and an auditorium. Six pilasters lined each facade of the building, and the main entrance, adorned by a segmented-arched canopy, was located on the north face of the building. The building was originally heated by coal fireplaces, necessitating a small structure (now demolished) on the southwest side of the main building to store the coal. When the building was updated to have steam heating in 1914, the coal house was no longer needed.

=== Annexation and growth ===
Also in 1914, a bond issue for almost $75,000 was approved for improvements and additions to all the city's schools. From this bond, the school built a brick annex south of the original building to accommodate a rise in the number of students in Meridian's public school system. The annex is also two stories, the second of which is connected to the second floor of the 1894 building via a skywalk. The first and second floors of the annex were used as classrooms, while a boiler room was located in the basement.

The school originally housed first through eighth grades but was expanded to twelve grades by 1921. In the 1915–16 school year, ninth and tenth grades were added; in 1919–1920, the eleventh grade was added; and in 1921-22 the twelfth grade was added with six students graduating that spring. Though several private schools such as the Meridian Baptist Seminary had been offering high school diplomas to black students before 1921, Wechsler School was the first public school in east central Mississippi to do so, and it remained the only one until 1937, when Meridian's black high school program was transferred to then new T.J. Harris High School. In the 1920s, the outside of the 1894 building was covered with stucco. Over time, the first floor was remodelled to contain an office, four classrooms, and restrooms, and the floors were covered with linoleum. The second floor contains five classrooms, office space, a library, and restrooms.

In 1922 the school added classes for adults, and in the Meridian-State Normal for Teachers moved to the school, allowing under-educated teachers to renew their teaching licenses. In 1929, fifty teachers graduated from the Normal at Wechsler. The highest number of student graduates from Wechsler was eighty-seven in the 1935–36 school year.

=== Decline of Wechsler ===
The high school (grades 9–12) moved to T.J. Harris High School in 1937, after which Wechsler served as an elementary and junior high school until 1971. Another addition was added to the campus in 1951 on the east side of the lot. The utilitarian style addition included four classrooms, an auditorium, stage, cafeteria, teachers' rooms, and showers. A staircase connects the 1894 building with the second floor of the addition, and a covered staircase leads to the entrance. Also in 1951, the basement of the 1914 annex was converted into classrooms, and the boiler room was moved to the new addition.

From 1971 to 1983 the school was used as a kindergarten for both black and white children, but was closed down after the 1983 school year. After being taken out of service as a school, the building was used by a theater organization from until 1986. The building then lay vacant for four years before members of the community formed the Wechsler Community Art Center in 1990. The school was listed on the National Register of Historic Places in 1991 and as a Mississippi Landmark in 1993.

In 1994 the school board deeded the building to the Wechsler Community Art Center Association. The association has started raising money to develop plans for renovation and reuse. The association hosted dances and parties catered to teens as fundraisers in the late-1990s and early 21st century. In 2000, it received funds from the state under a new program of grants for African-American heritage sites. The first phase provided funding for stabilization and reuse. The association has a multi-year plan to renovate the building for an art center and extended community use. Recently, a local push has been underway to convert the facility into a charter school.

== Former principals ==
Though the building was not completed until 1894, the construction bond passed in 1888, and the first principal was selected to manage the planning for the school. The former principals of the school include:

- E.H. Triplett (1888–1896)
- O.C. Garrett (1896–1902)
- William Hopkins (1902–1916)
- R.S. Groosley (1916–1918)
- Thomas J. Harris (1918–1937)
- Lydia Carr (1937–1945)
- Jennie Ruth Crump (1945–????)
