= Kathy Ainsworth =

American Ku Klux Klan terrorist

Kathryn Madlyn Ainsworth
- Born: Kathryn Madlyn Capomacchia; July 31, 1941; Chicago, Illinois, U.S.
- Died: June 30, 1968 (aged 26); Meridian, Mississippi, U.S.
- Cause of death: Gunshot wound
- Other names: Kathy (sometimes spelled 'Kathie'); Kathleen
- Occupation: Elementary school teacher
- Spouse: Ralph Ainsworth

Kathryn Madlyn Ainsworth (née Capomacchia; July 31, 1941 – June 30, 1968) was an American Ku Klux Klan terrorist. She was killed by law enforcement in 1968 during her failed assassination attempt on a prominent Jewish Mississippian.

== Early life ==
Kathryn Madlyn Ainsworth was born Kathryn Madlyn Capomacchia on July 31, 1941. Capomacchia was raised by her mother, who was known to have anti-Semitic views. She introduced Kathy to the works of far-right political organizer Gerald L. K. Smith, founder of the Christian Nationalist Crusade and member of the Silver Legion of America.

Kathy was a devout churchgoer. She taught Sunday school and sang in choir at Coral Baptist Church in Miami.

Capomacchia attended college at Mississippi College in Clinton, Mississippi. In the spring of 1960, she roomed with Bonnie Barnes, the daughter of extremist Sidney Crockett Barnes – a devoted follower of Wesley Swift. In the years between graduation and marriage, Kathy Capomacchia and her mother were frequent guests at the Barnes home in Mobile, Alabama where she met her future lover, Thomas Albert Tarrants III (born December 20, 1946) of Mobile, Alabama.

Around the summer of 1967, Kathy Capomacchia married Ralph Ainsworth.

== Radicalism ==
Ainsworth and her companion, Thomas Tarrants, were both members of the White Knights of the Ku Klux Klan, one of the most militant white terrorist organizations during the Civil Rights era. Ainsworth, herself, was also a member of two additional KKK groups: the Original Knights of the Ku Klux Klan and the United Klans of America – as well as a Klan front called Americans for the Preservation of the White Race.

According to police sources and numerous acquaintances of the two, older fanatics had influenced Kathy and Thomas with propaganda and hate material that came from organizations in Arizona, California, New Jersey and other states.

Unbeknownst to her husband, Ainsworth began training in firearms and explosives in 1967. He was aware of his wife's Klan connections, but not of her deep involvement.

== Congregation Beth Israel bombing ==
On May 28, 1968, Ainsworth, along with Tarrants, participated in the bombing of the Congregation Beth Israel in 1968.

== Death ==
Early on the morning of June 30, 1968, Kathy Ainsworth and Thomas Tarrants drove to the home of Meyer Davidson planning to place a bomb on the side of his house below where they believed his bedroom to be. Ainsworth waited in their car while Tarrants attempted to blow up Davidson's home with a homemade bomb consisting of 29 sticks of dynamite.

Los Angeles Times reporter Jack Nelson documented the payment of $36,500 by ADL director Adolph Botnick, acting as agent provocateur, to two Klansmen, Raymond and Alton Wayne Roberts, in order to set up Tarrants in an ambush organized by the FBI and local police. A bloody shootout took place, Ainsworth was shot in the neck and died immediately. A loaded pistol and a KKK membership card were found in her purse. Right wing literature from groups including the Minutemen and the National States' Rights Party was found during a search of her home.

Tarrants survived numerous wounds and was sentenced to 30 years in prison. The prosecution had sought a death sentence under a rarely-used state law regarding the criminal use of explosives. However, the jury declined to make a decision, and left it to the judge, who spared Tarrants's life. In 1969, Tarrants escaped from prison with two other convicts, Malcolm Houston, who was serving a 15-year sentence for bank robbery, and Louis Shadoan, who was serving a two-year sentence for child molestation. Shadoan was killed in a shootout with the FBI, while Houston and Tarrants later surrendered. Tarrants spent five years in maximum security for the escape.

In December 1976, Tarrants, who had since become a Born Again Christian who had renounced his racist views, was freed under a work release program. Since then, he has preached against racism.

The car's owner was identified to be Danny Joe Hawkins, a Ku Klux Klan hitman who had helped bomb Beth Israel.
