= Freedom Schools =

Temporary, alternative free schools for American Southern blacks

Freedom Schools, which operated during the mid-1960s, were temporary, alternative, free schools for African Americans and other minorities. Prominent in the South but present throughout the United States, they were originally part of a nationwide effort during the civil rights movement to organize African Americans to achieve social, political and economic equality. The movement consisted of a series of programs challenging the inequalities of segregated Southern education, transforming learning into a tool for liberation and empowerment and providing knowledge and critical thinking skills, and continues to influence educational and social movements. Their curriculum differed from that of the public schools: going beyond reading and writing to explore African American history, civic engagement, and the philosophy of nonviolent resistance in the context of its association with the civil rights movement. They encouraged students to think critically and explore their creativity.

Almost 40 Freedom Schools were established, serving over 2,500 students in one summer; students also included parents and grandparents. Classes were held in church basements, community centers, or homes due to threats to safety and lack of resources. Most teachers were activists, and African Americans and whites contributed to the success of the Freedom Schools.

== Origins ==
Despite the Supreme Court's ruling of 1954 in the Brown v. Board of Education case, which struck down segregated school systems, Mississippi and many other states, still maintained separate and unequal white and "colored" school systems during the mid-1960s. On average, the state spent $81.66 to educate a white student and $21.77 for a Black student. Mississippi was one of only two states without a mandatory-education law; many children in rural areas were sent to work in the fields, and received little education; the curriculum was different for white and Black students; the white school board of Bolivar County mandated that "Neither foreign languages nor civics shall be taught in Negro schools. Nor shall American history from 1860 to 1875 be taught."

Students faced more de facto segregation during the decade following Brown than before. Many white schools were half-full, but schools reserved for African Americans, Latinx and other minorities were overcrowded, underfunded and understaffed. In severe cases, students attended school in shifts to avoid overcrowding and accommodate the limited staff. Many schools showed significant progress in integration, providing access to better resources, higher educational quality and opportunities for African American students; test scores indicated that the performance gap between African American and white children began to decrease, demonstrating the impact of equal access to education. Some schools refused to integrate African American and white children, however, shutting public schools for years to avoid following the Supreme Court ruling.

Student Nonviolent Coordinating Committee activist Charles Cobb proposed in late 1963 that SNCC sponsor a network of Freedom Schools, inspired by examples used previously in cities. In the summer of 1963, the county board of education in Prince Edward County, Virginia closed the public schools rather than integrate them after a lawsuit following Brown; Freedom Schools emerged in their stead. About 3,000 students participated in a September 1963 Stay Out for Freedom protest in Boston, opting to attend community-organized Freedom Schools. On October 22, 1963 (known as Freedom Day), more than 200,000 students boycotted the Chicago Public Schools to protest segregation and poor school conditions; some attended Freedom Schools instead. In a similar February 3, 1964 Freedom Day protest, over 450,000 students participated in a boycott of the New York City public schools in the largest civil-rights demonstration of the 1960s, and up to 100,000 students attended Freedom Schools.

Change was slow; many schools remained segregated until the late 1960s, but African Americans and minorities were closer to integrated educational systems with each boycott. Freedom Schools, led by SNCC and NAACP advocates, filled educational gaps; students were educated in churches, community centers, or homes led by boycotting teachers or civil-rights advocates, enhancing their understanding of civic duty in the fight for desegregation.

== Mississippi schools ==
The Mississippi Freedom Schools were developed as part of the 1964 Freedom Summer civil-rights project, an effort that focused on voter registration drives and educating Mississippi students for social change. The Council of Federated Organizations (COFO)—an umbrella civil-rights organization of activists and funds drawn from SNCC, CORE, the NAACP, SCLC—coordinated Freedom Summer.

The project was essentially a statewide voter-registration campaign, and its framers called for one thousand volunteers to assist. Activists made plans to conduct a parallel Democratic primary election; the systematic exclusion of Black voters resulted in all-white delegations to presidential conventions, and the Mississippi Freedom Democratic Party was created. The Democratic and Mississippi Freedom Democratic Party delegations attended the 1964 Democratic National Convention in Atlantic City, New Jersey.

In December 1963, during planning for Freedom Summer, Charles Cobb proposed a network of "Freedom Schools" that would foster political participation in Mississippi elementary and high-school students and offer academic courses and discussions. Activists organizing the Freedom Summer project accepted Cobb's proposal, and organized a curriculum-planning conference in New York in March 1964 sponsored by the National Council of Churches. Spelman College history professor Staughton Lynd was appointed director of the Freedom Schools program.

During Freedom Summer, more than 40 Freedom Schools were set up in Black communities throughout Mississippi to attempt to end political displacement of African Americans by encouraging students to become active citizens and socially involved in the community. Over 3,000 African American students attended these schools in the summer of 1964. Students ranged in age from young children to the elderly, with the average age about 15. Teachers were volunteers, most college students themselves.

With few exceptions, Freedom School teachers were amazed at the enthusiasm of their students. One volunteer wrote home,

Dear Mom and Dad, The atmosphere in class is unbelievable. It is what every teacher dreams about—real, honest enthusiasm and desire to learn anything and everything. The girls come to class of their own free will. They respond to everything that is said. They are excited about learning. They drain me of everything that I have to offer so that I go home at night completely exhausted but very happy.

== Political and educational objectives ==
The Freedom Schools had political and educational objectives. Teachers would educate elementary and high school students to become social-change agents participating in the civil rights movement, most often in voter-registration efforts. Their curriculum was divided into seven core areas that analyzed the social, political, and economic context of precarious race relations and the civil rights movement. Leadership development was encouraged in addition to traditional academic skills. Education at Freedom Schools was student-centered and culturally relevant. Curriculum and instruction were based on the student needs; discussion among students and teachers (rather than lecturing) was encouraged, and curriculum planners encouraged teachers to base instruction on student experiences.

Kathy Emery, Sylvia Braselmann and Linda Gold, who edited Freedom School Curriculum, 1964, describe the movement's political and educational objectives as surrounding questions and activities that encourage discussion and strengthen the relationship between school and students' lives. The schools were student-focused, allowing students to think for themselves with connections to current events. Education had always been an integral part of African-American freedom, desegregation, and empowerment. After the Jim Crow era, education became a form of resistance in which the enslaved would receive education from Christian missionaries and newspapers. This gave them hope for freedom, and inspired resistance.

== Curriculum ==
Curriculum was developed with conferencing and discussion by teachers and directors. Teachers wrote an outline, keeping in mind life in Mississippi and the time they had to teach. The curriculum, based on questions and activities, had to be teacher-friendly and useful to the students. According to Josh Davidson, who contributed to an article entitled "Exploring the History of Freedom Schools—Civil Rights Teaching", "Through reading, writing, arithmetic, history, and civics, participants received a progressive curriculum during a six-week summer program that was designed to prepare disenfranchised African Americans to become active political actors on their own behalf". The Freedom School curriculum was intended to cultivate intellectual and life skills – not preparing students for a world of labor in factories, but a life where they could be active politically: participating in democracy, advocating for their rights, and challenging the system of racial hierarchy. The focus was on questions and discussion, rather than the memorization of facts and dates. Instructions to teachers included:

In the matter of classroom procedure, questioning is the vital tool. It is meaningless to flood the student with information he [or she] cannot understand; questioning is the path to enlightenment ... The value of the Freedom Schools will derive mainly from what the teachers are able to elicit from the students in terms of comprehension and expression of their experiences.

The final curriculum outline had three sections: academic, citizenship and recreation. Its purpose was to teach students social change within the school, regional history, Black history, how to answer open-ended questions, and academic skills. The academic curriculum consisted of reading, writing, and verbal activities based on the student's experiences. The citizenship curriculum encouraged students to ask questions about society, and the recreational curriculum required the student to be physically active. In most Freedom Schools, the citizenship curriculum focused on two sets of related questions for class discussion:

- Why are we (teachers and students) in Freedom Schools?
- What is the Freedom Movement?
- What alternatives does the Freedom Movement offer us?
- What does the majority culture have that we want?
- What does the majority culture have that we don't want?
- What do we have that we want to keep?

== First year ==
Freedom Schools opened during the first week of July 1964, after about 250 Freedom School volunteer teachers attended one-week training sessions at Western College for Women in Oxford, Ohio. The original plans had anticipated 25 Freedom Schools and 1,000 students; by the end of the summer, 41 schools had been opened to over 2,500 students.

Schools were established with the help and commitment of local communities, who provided buildings for schools and housing for the volunteer teachers. Although some of the schools were held in parks, kitchens, homes and under trees, most classes were held in churches or church basements. Attendance varied during the summer; some schools had consistent attendance, which was the exception. Because attendance was not compulsory, recruitment and maintaining attendance was one of the primary challenges faced by the schools. In Clarksdale, Mississippi, the average student attendance during the first week was fifteen; it was eight during the second week, but at any point during the summer the school may have had as many as thirty-five students in attendance. It was not uncommon for adults to attend class regularly.

Instruction was based on local conditions. In rural communities where students were expected to work during the school day, classes were often held at night. In schools with traditional school hours (typically in urban areas), the citizenship curriculum and traditional academic courses were offered in the morning; special classes, such as music, drama, and typing, were offered in the afternoon. In many instances, entire school days would be devoted to voter-registration efforts. It was imperative for SNCC activists that students be invested in civil-rights activity because this cadre of students was expected to remain in the state to enact social change.

At the conclusion of the Freedom School term, activists and students organized a student-led August 8, 1964, conference on the day after the funeral of James Chaney (one of the victims of the murders of Chaney, Goodman, and Schwerner). The conference was held at the former Meridian Baptist Seminary in Meridian, Mississippi, described as "the palace of the Freedom School circuit." Each Freedom School sent three representatives to the conference to form a youth platform for the Mississippi Freedom Democratic Party. The student delegates discussed issues related to jobs, schools, foreign affairs and public accommodations, making recommendations for the state party. By the end of the conference, students prepared a statement demanding access to public accommodations, building codes for each home, integrated schools, a public-works program, and the appointment of qualified Blacks to state positions.

Freedom School teachers and students remained committed to the schools' concept. Plans were made in early August 1964 to continue the Freedom Schools during the upcoming school year, and some volunteer teachers had already agreed to stay. Students decided during the early-August Freedom School Conference not to continue the schools, but students implemented the summer's leadership and activism in their own schools. Some students returned to school and demanded better facilities and more courses; students in Philadelphia, Mississippi, were expelled for wearing SNCC "One Man, One Vote" buttons.

== Freedom Library Day School, Philadelphia ==
Cover of What Black Educators Are Saying, printed by Leswing Press

The Philadelphia Freedom Library was founded by John E. Churchville in 1964. Churchville began offering evening classes over the next few years, and eventually converted the library into a school. He then prepared a short set of essays which were published in What Black Educators Are Saying, edited by Nathan Wright Jr. and published in 1970. The essay includes Churchville's thoughts on the state of the Black Power movement and his ideas for the pedagogy of his Freedom School, denigrating the cultural and progressive nationalist movements as toothless facades. For Churchville the Revolutionary Nationalist Movement, which called for global revolution, was the most accurate and true to its principles. The movement identified group and individual issues facing Black people in the US, and believed that the only way to become a revolutionary was to be born-again, acted on by an outside power which began to rid one of deficiencies. The schools were based on a simple set of priorities. If education is the indoctrination of the young into an ideological system, the Freedom School must reeducate Black children to reject the dominant ideology and construct a new system. The first element of pedagogy must be the school's new ideology. Teachers must then be found who can bridge the gap between identity and alienation, being object lessons for their students in and out of the classroom. The curriculum was designed to explain the situation of Black people and teach the tools and skills to deal with that reality. As described by Churchville, it was a vehicle for teaching revolutionary truth; the content was irrelevant, since it was the analysis which would demonstrate the reality. The school was raided by the FBI on August 13, 1966, on the suspicion of harboring militant groups. After the raid, Churchville withdrew from activism.

== Other schools ==
=== Prince Edward County Virginia, 1963-1964 ===
The Prince Edward Free School was founded when the county closed its public schools for five years in an attempt to avoid the precedent set by Brown v. Board of Education. In response, African-American and minority communities, civil-rights leaders and organizers, and families built "free schools" run by community members. A key school in Virginia was the Prince Edward Free School, which provided academic and cultural education and raised student civic awareness and political understanding. The NAACP and local churches provided space, teachers and textbooks, and the public schools were eventually reopened after a Supreme Court decision. Although this school was not associated with the Freedom Schools and Freedom Summer, it was built on the resilience and dedication of community members who found this educational style a form of resistance against segregation.

=== Boston, Massachusetts (1963-1964): Freedom Stay-Outs ===
The Freedom Stay-Outs were a series of protest days where students and families boycotted schools to resist de facto segregation with zoning and overcrowding. Students would attend "Freedom Schools" in churches, basements, or community centers instead of attending public schools. The first of many protests took place on June 18, 1963. When the issue was raised with superintendent Frederick Gillis, he said that it was the result of residential patterns and the educational system and its districts were not based on ethnic or religious factors. Committee chair Louise Day Hicks refused to acknowledge that anything was wrong with the infrastructure or educational system of the schools. Community leaders, activists, clergy and others formed the Freedom Stay-Out Committee, co-led by Noel A. Day and James Breeden, which organized the Boston Freedom Schools. Day had moved to Boston from New York to be a social worker after his education at Dartmouth College, and later became a community organizer. Breeden, a priest at St. James Church in Roxbury who was an activist and community organizer, was one of the 15 Freedom Riders arrested in Mississippi in 1961. Another protest occurred about two weeks later, where 8,260 students skipped class and 3,000 attended classes at a Freedom School.

=== 1964 New York City Freedom Day Boycott ===
Students faced an increase in segregation in the decade after Brown v. Board of Education as a result of redlining, zoning laws, and opposition to integration by parents and school systems. According to a Lower East Side Tenement Museum source, the number of schools considered segregated increased from 52 in 1954 to over 200 by 1964. Public schools in white neighborhoods were half-full, and African-American and Puerto Rican schools were overcrowded and underfunded. Harlem (a majority African-American neighborhood) had only one high school during the early 1960s, and students were forced to attend school in shifts to avoid overcrowding. Harlem schools lacked libraries, gyms, and special-education and English classes. By the early 1960s, opposition to these conditions grew in New York; Milton Galamison, a pastor and civil-rights activist, was the leading voice in the fight for integrated schools. Leaders compromised, saying that they would set in motion a plan that would integrate some schools in five years. Unsatisfied, desegregation leaders organized a one-day "Freedom Day Boycott" on February 3, 1964; over 460,000 students walked out of classes or stayed home. More than 90,000 students attended "Freedom Schools" in parks, churches, and homes which were directed by teachers who were also boycotting. The movement, double the size of the March on Washington, was the largest protest of the civil-rights era. After the boycott, the New York City Board of Education announced that it would start a program busing students from minority to majority neighborhoods to fill the white schools.

== Legacy ==
The Children's Defense Fund (CDF) operates a nationwide Freedom School program coordinated through the fund's Black Community Crusade for Children initiative. The CDF Freedom Schools program operates over 130 summer-program sites in 24 states, serving nearly 7,200 children.

The Philadelphia Freedom Schools remain an independent community education initiative, operating a modern version of the Mississippi curriculum with an emphasis on academic scholarship, social action and inter-generational leadership. The schools are organized through a lead agency, Communities In Schools.

== See also ==
- Ruleville, Mississippi
- Gluckstadt, Mississippi
- Carthage, Mississippi
