= Smith-Bontura-Evans House =

Historic house in Mississippi, United States

- Smith-Bontura-Evans-House
- U.S. National Register of Historic Places
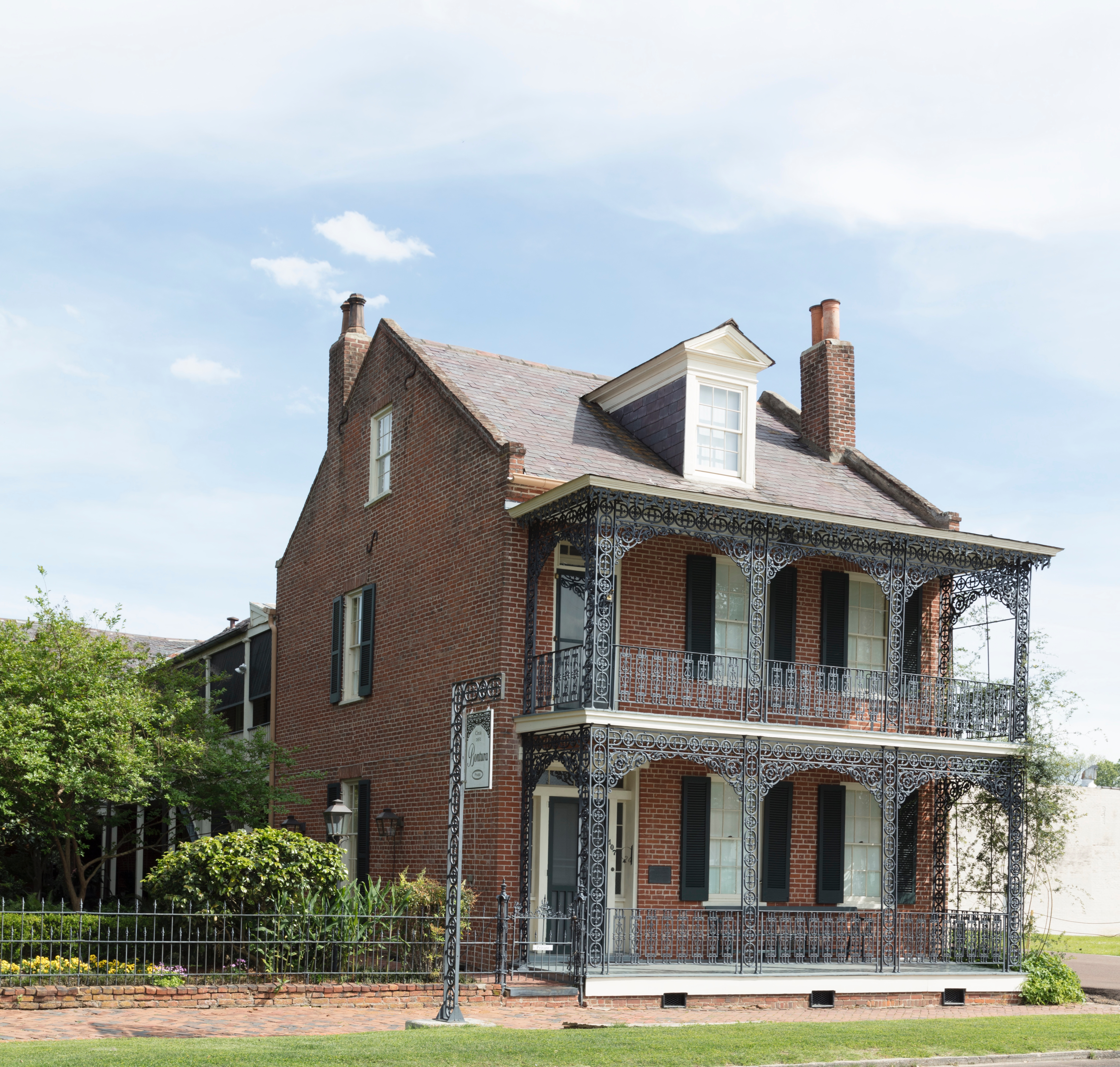

- Location within Mississippi Location within the United States
- Nearest city: Natchez, Mississippi
- Coordinates: 31°33′40″N 91°24′22″W
- Built: 1851
- Architectural style: Greek Revival
- NRHP reference No.: 78001585
- Added to NRHP: March 29, 1978

The Smith-Bontura-Evans-House, also known as Evansview and better known as Bontura, is a historic house and business built by Robert D. Smith in Natchez, Mississippi. A free African American, Smith built the combined building for his livery business and a Greek Revival residence between 1851 and 1858. It was listed on the National Register of Historic Places on March 29, 1978.

In 1977 the property was owned by the Natchez Town chapter of the National Society of the Colonial Dames of America. It has been privately owned since 1996.

== See also ==
- List of African-American historic places in Mississippi
