= Fainting couch =

Couch with a back that is traditionally raised at one end

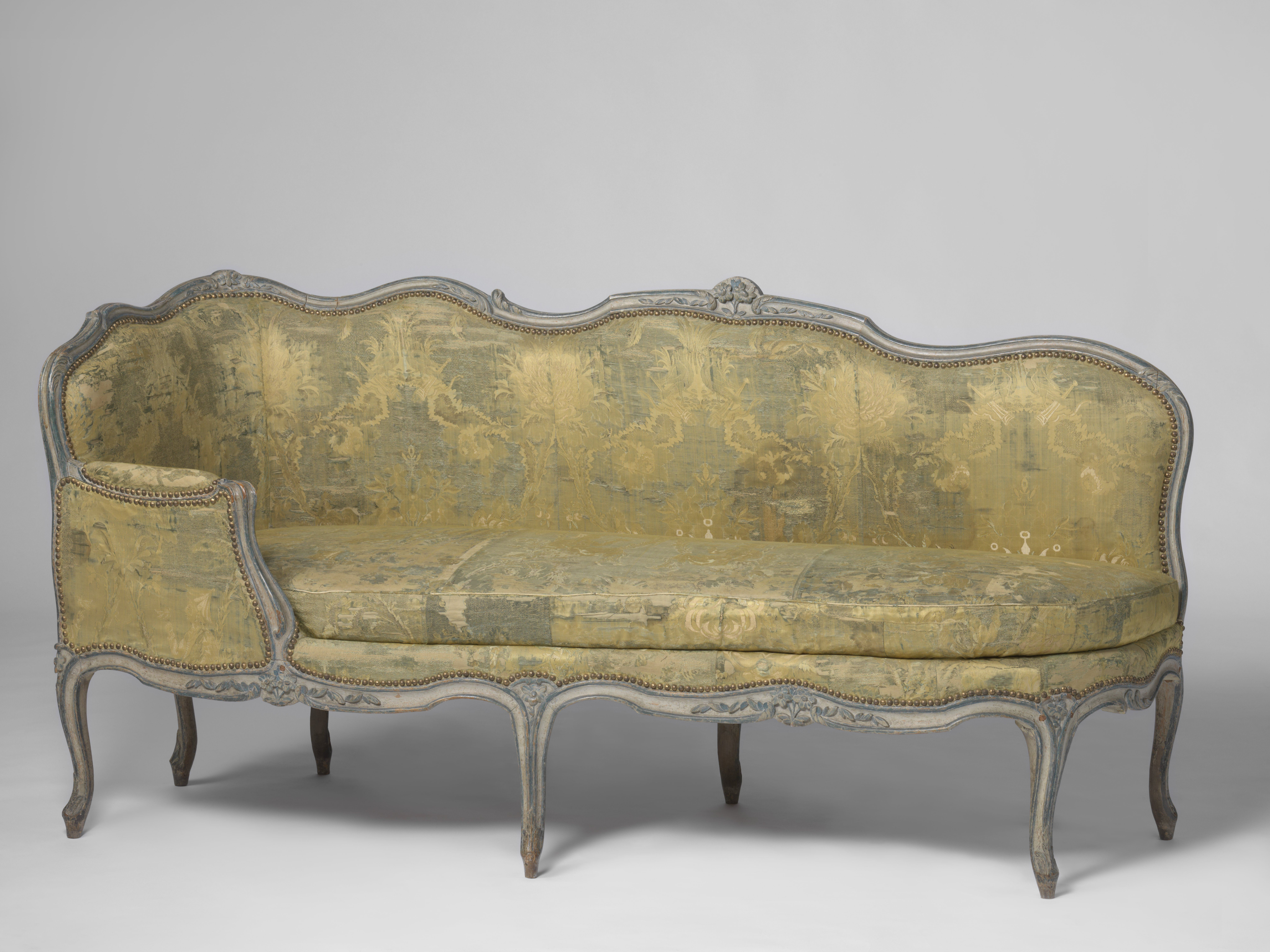
Méridienne (c. 1750–1760)

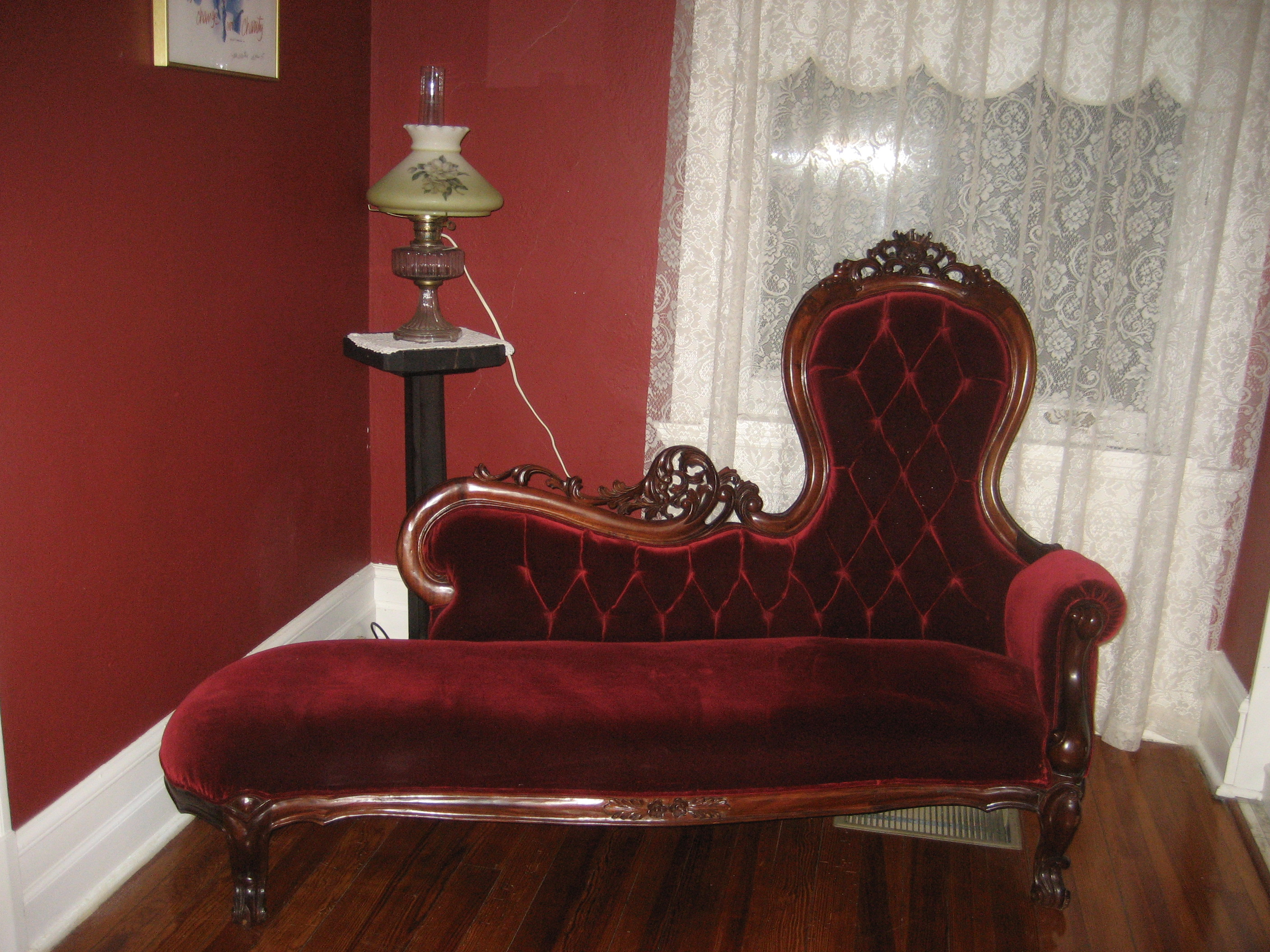
Red upholstered fainting couch

A fainting couch is a modern term describing a couch with a back traditionally raised at one end. The back may be situated completely on one side of the couch or wrapped around and extended to the entire piece, much like a traditional couch. However, "fainting couches" are easily differentiated from more traditional couches, with one end of the back raised.

The "fainting couch" style was popular in the 19th century as a revival of ancient furniture styles.

== Myth about usage ==
Popular speculation explains the predominance of what is called a "fainting couch" in the 19th century as a result of women fainting because their corsets were too tight, restricting blood flow. This does not have historical support; it has been proposed instead that these "day beds" (as they were referred to at the time) were in imitation of Roman and Grecian daybed designs.

The term "fainting couch" is not documented until the 20th century. Historian Stephanie Celiberti writes that there is nothing to suggest in advertising of the Victorian era that any article of furniture was created for people to use when feeling faint, and this should only be considered a myth.

== See also ==
- Chaise longue
