= Meridian Baptist Seminary =

- Formerly listed on the U.S. National Register of Historic Places
- Location within Mississippi Location within the United States
- Location: 16th St. and 31st Ave., Meridian, Mississippi
- Coordinates: 32°22′22″N 88°42′34″W
- Built: 1920
- Architect: Tom Ware; et al.
- NRHP reference No.: 79001326

Significant dates
- Added to NRHP: January 8, 1979
- Removed from NRHP: July 16, 2008

Meridian Baptist Seminary is a former educational institution for African Americans in Meridian, Mississippi. The college was listed on the National Register of Historic Places on January 8, 1979, but delisted in 2008 after a fire destroyed the building in 2007.

== History ==
The seminary was founded in 1896 and initially held classes in the basement of New Hope Baptist Church. In 1905, a two-story building was built at the corner of 16th Street and 31st Avenue, and the school moved classes there. That building was demolished in 1920 and replaced by a brick building built by local black carpenters. The school offered a traditional high school curriculum for black students, along with college preparatory and vocational programs. It was the first school in Mississippi to offer high school diplomas to African Americans.

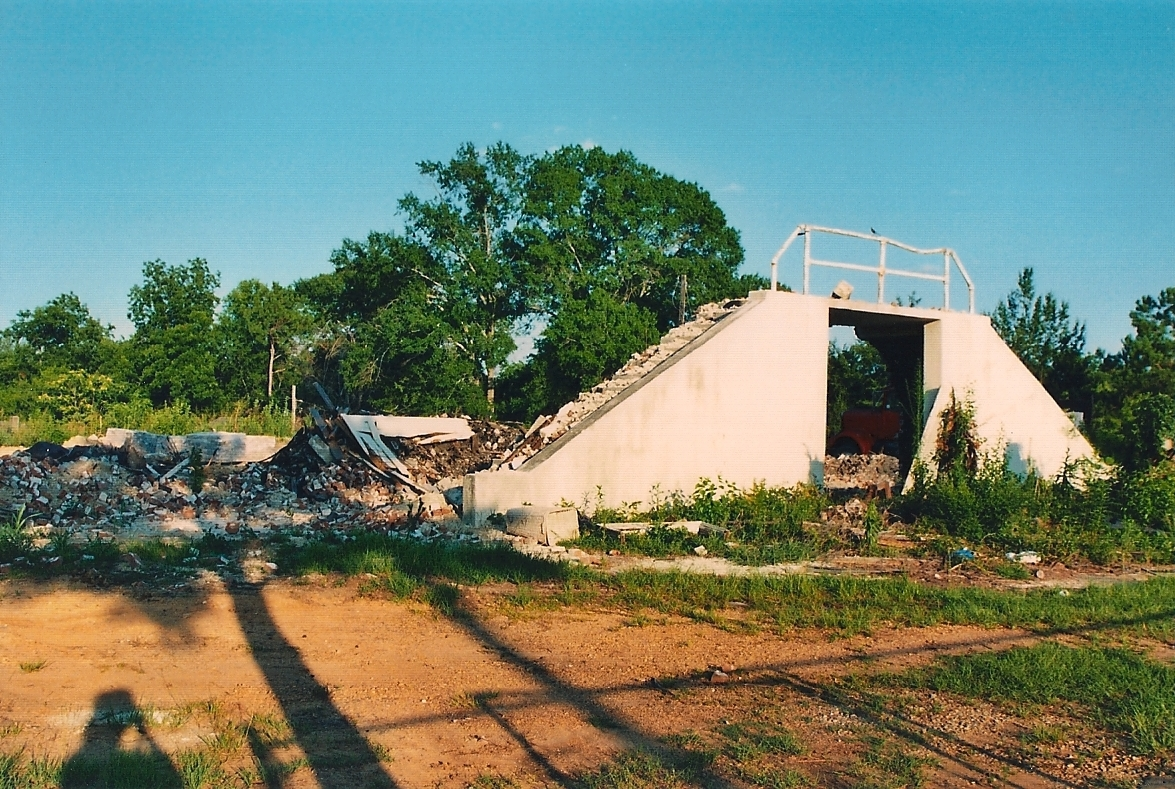
What is left of the Seminary after the 2007 fire

After flourishing through the 1920s and 1930s, the school began offering only two-year high school transfer certificates in 1949, after which academic offerings gradually decreased. The school hosted several Freedom Schools during the American Civil Rights Movement of the 1960s. It was described as "the palace of the Freedom School circuit" after hosting a convention for the schools on August 8, 1964, the day after the funeral of James Chaney, one of the workers killed in the murders of Chaney, Goodman, and Schwerner.

After closing in 1972, the building was used very rarely. After almost ten years of no use because of safety concerns, an overnight fire on September 16, 2007, burned the building to the ground. After an investigation, the cause of the fire could not be determined due to the extent of the damage.
