= 2025 Mississippi local elections =

Municipal elections in American state

- April 1 — June 3, 2025
- Cities over 30,000 with municipal elections. Click on a city name to skip to that city's section.

Mississippi is scheduled to hold elections in its various municipalities throughout 2025. Municipal elections in Mississippi are partisan.

== Election schedule ==
Source: Mississippi Secretary of State's office.

- April 1: Primary election.
- April 22: Primary election runoffs.
- June 3: General election.

== Jackson ==
2025 Jackson mayoral election
- June 3, 2025
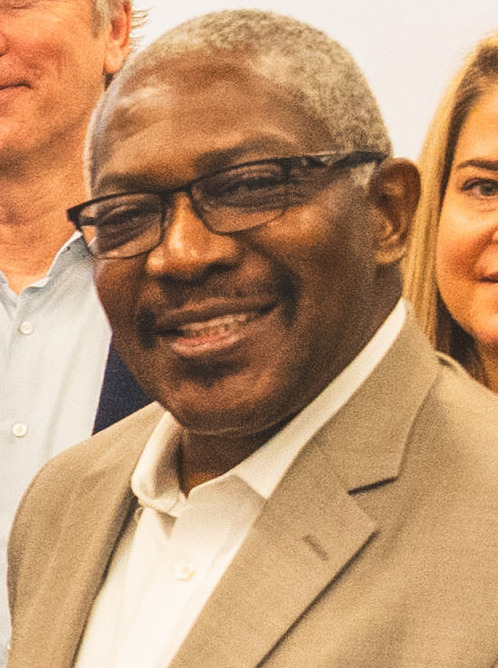

Candidate	John Horhn	Kenny Gee
Party	Democratic	Republican
Incumbent Mayor
Chokwe Antar Lumumba
Democratic

The incumbent mayor of Jackson, Mississippi is Democrat Chokwe Antar Lumumba, serving since 2017. He won his last election in 2021 with 69.1% of the vote. In November 2024, Lumumba was indicted on federal bribery charges. He finished with a distant second place in the Democratic primary, losing to John Horhn.

=== Democratic primary ===
==== Nominee ====
- John Horhn, member of the Mississippi State Senate from the 26th district (1993–present)

==== Eliminated in runoff ====
- Chokwe A. Lumumba, incumbent mayor (2017–present)

==== Eliminated in first round ====
- David Archie, former Hinds County supervisor
- James "Blue" Butler
- LaKeisha J. Crye
- Delano Funches
- Socrates Garrett, businessman
- Tim Henderson
- James E. Hopkins
- Kourtney Christopher Paige
- Keyshia E. Sanders, convicted felon
- Ali M. ShamsidDeen, candidate for the Seventh Judicial District in 2014
- Marcus Wallace, former mayor of Edwards, Mississippi (2013–2021)
- Albert Wilson, businessman and Democratic primary candidate for Governor of Mississippi in 2019

==== Results ====
2025 Jackson mayoral Democratic primary election
First round	Candidate	Primary Apr. 1, 2025		Runoff Apr. 22, 2025 (Unofficial)	
Democratic	John Horhn	12,359	48.36%	17,729	74.90%
Democratic	Chokwe A. Lumumba (incumbent)	4,285	16.77%	5,940	25.10%
Democratic	Tim Henderson	3,499	13.69%	Eliminated	
Democratic	Delano Funches	2,118	8.29%	Eliminated	
Democratic	Marcus Wallace	1,041	4.07%	Eliminated	
Democratic	Socrates Garrett	684	2.68%	Eliminated	
Democratic	David Archie	552	2.16%	Eliminated	
Democratic	LaKeisha J. Crye	361	1.41%	Eliminated	
Democratic	Albert Wilson	281	1.10%	Eliminated	
Democratic	James E. Hopkins	264	1.03%	Eliminated	
Democratic	Kourtney Christopher Paige	85	0.33%	Eliminated	
Democratic	James "Blue" Butler	29	0.11%	Eliminated	
Total		25,558	100.00%	23,669	100.00%

=== Republican primary ===
==== Nominee ====
- Kenny Gee

==== Eliminated in runoff ====
- Wilfred Beal

==== Eliminated in first round ====
- Ponto Downing, Republican primary candidate for Mayor of Jackson in 2021

==== Results ====
2025 Jackson mayoral Republican primary election (unofficial results)
Party	Candidate	Primary (unofficial) Apr. 1, 2025		Runoff Apr. 22, 2025 Unofficial	
Republican	Kenny Gee	129	40.82%	97	63.40%
Republican	Wilfred Beal	117	37.03%	56	36.60%
Republican	Ponto Ronnie Downing	70	22.15%	Eliminated	
Total		316	100.00%	153	100.00%

=== Minor party and independent candidates ===
The following candidates have filed to be on the general election ballot awaiting certification:

- Rodney DePriest
- John Olver Emmerich III
- Zach Servis
- Lille Stewart-Robinson
- Kim Wade

=== General election ===
2025 Jackson mayoral election
Party	Candidate	Votes	%
Democratic	John Horhn	16,377	67.2%
Independent	Rodney DePriest	6,736	27.6%
Independent	Zach Servis	620	2.5%
Republican	Kenny Gee	232	1%
Independent	Lille Stewart-Robinson	202	0.8%
Independent	Kim Wade	196	0.8%
Total votes			

=== Official campaign websites ===
- Rodney DePriest (I)
- Delano Funches (D, eliminated)
- Socrates Garrett (D, eliminated)
- Tim Henderson (D, eliminated)
- John Horhn (D)
- Chokwe A. Lumumba (D, eliminated)
- Kim Wade (I)
- Marcus Wallace (D, eliminated)
- Albert Wilson (D, eliminated)

== Biloxi ==
2025 Biloxi mayoral election
- June 3, 2025
Candidate	Andrew "FoFo" Gilich	Farren Santibanez	Andy Linville
Party	Republican	Libertarian	Independent
Incumbent Mayor
Andrew "FoFo" Gilich
Republican

The incumbent mayor of Biloxi, Mississippi is Republican Andrew "FoFo" Gilich, first elected in a special election in May 2015. He is running for a third full term in office. Gilich won the 2021 general election unopposed with 5% turnout.

=== Republican primary ===
The following candidates have filed to be on the Republican primary election ballot awaiting certification:

==== Nominee ====
- Andrew "FoFo" Gilich, incumbent mayor

==== Eliminated in primary ====
- Jordan N. Gollub, segregationist and former KKK member

==== Results ====
2025 Biloxi mayoral Republican primary election (unofficial results)
Party	Candidate	Votes	%
Republican	Andrew "FoFo" Gilich (incumbent)	2,422	89.17%
Republican	Jordan N. Gollub	294	10.83%
Total votes		2,716	100.00%

=== Minor party and independent candidates ===
The following candidates have filed to be on the general election ballot awaiting certification:

- Andy Linville (Independent)
- Farren Santibanez (Libertarian)

=== General election ===
2025 Biloxi mayoral election
Party	Candidate	Votes	%
Republican	Andrew "FoFo" Gilich (incumbent)	2,630	80.2%
Libertarian	Farren Santibanez	187	5.7%
Independent	Andy Linville	461	14.1%
Total votes			

== Gulfport ==
2025 Gulfport mayoral election
- June 3, 2025
Candidate	Hugh Keating	Sonya Williams-Barnes
Party	Republican	Democratic
Incumbent Mayor
Billy Hewes
Republican

The incumbent mayor of Gulfport, Mississippi is Republican Billy Hewes, serving since 2013. He declined to run for re-election to a fourth term. He was last elected in 2021 with 63.5% of the vote.

=== Republican primary ===
==== Nominee ====
- Hugh Keating, attorney

==== Declined ====
- Billy Hewes, incumbent mayor (2013–present)

=== Democratic primary ===
==== Nominee ====
- Sonya Williams-Barnes, former member of the Mississippi House of Representatives from the 119th district (2012–2022)

==== Eliminated in primary ====
- Ronnie Henderson, former professional basketball player for the Washington Bullets

==== Results ====
2025 Gulfport mayoral Democratic primary election (unofficial results)
Party	Candidate	Votes	%
Democratic	Sonya Williams-Barnes	3,280	84.27%
Democratic	Ronnie Henderson	612	15.73%
Total votes		3,892	100.00%

=== General election ===
2025 Gulfport mayoral election
Party	Candidate	Votes	%
Republican	Hugh Keating	6,902	53.2%
Democratic	Sonya Williams-Barnes	6,073	46.8%
Total votes		12,975	100.00%

=== Official campaign websites ===
- Hugh Keating (R)
- Sonya Williams-Barnes (D)
- Ronnie Henderson (D, eliminated)

== Hattiesburg ==
2025 Hattiesburg mayoral election
- June 3, 2025
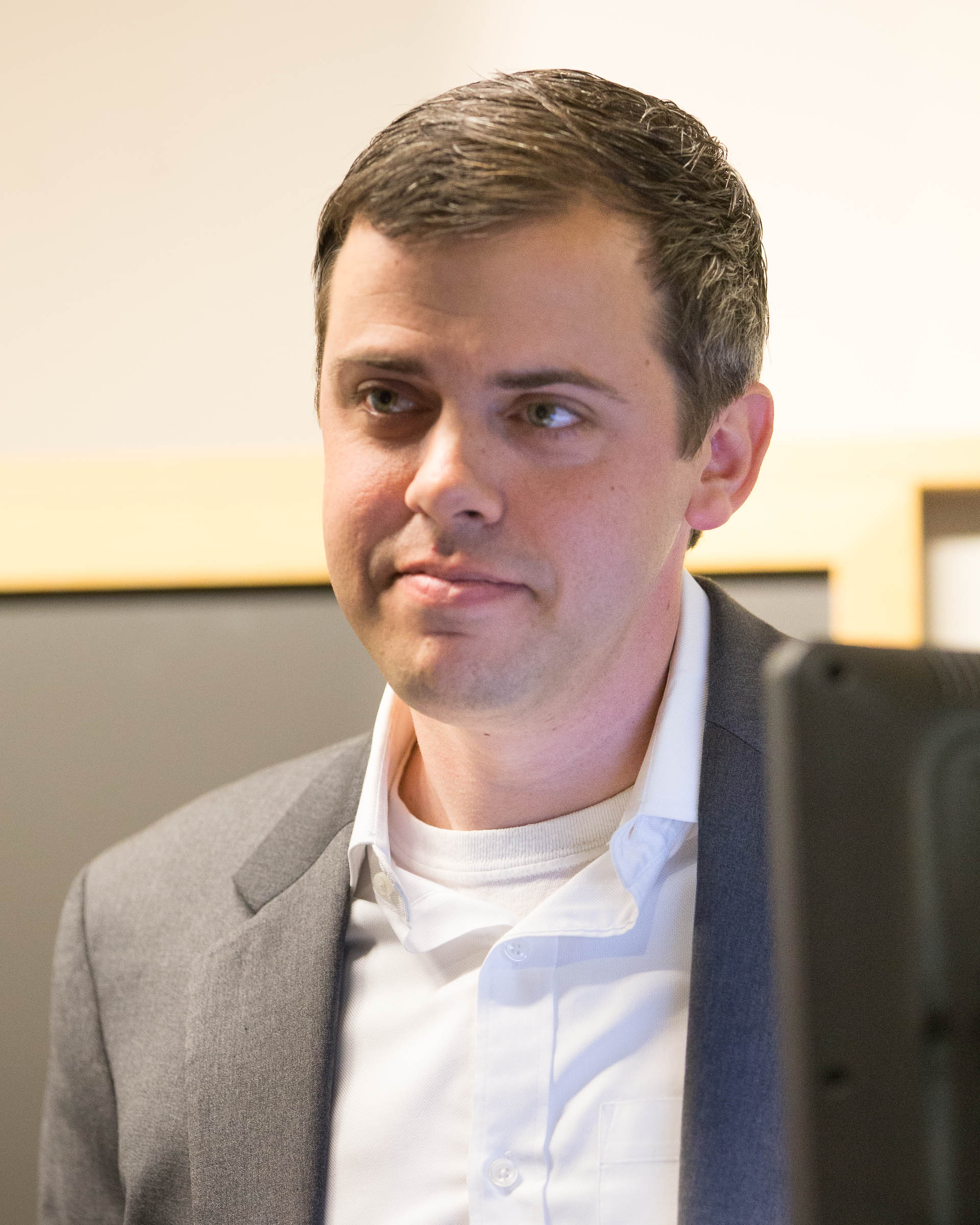
Candidate	Toby Barker
Party	Independent
Incumbent Mayor
Toby Barker
Independent

The incumbent mayor of Hattiesburg, Mississippi is independent Toby Barker, serving since 2017. He is running completely unopposed. He won his last election in 2021 with 85% of the vote.

=== Minor party and independent candidates ===
The following candidate has filed to be on the election ballot awaiting certification:

- Toby Barker, incumbent mayor (2017–present) and Republican member of the Mississippi House of Representatives from the 102nd district (2008–2017)

=== General election ===
2025 Hattiesburg mayoral election
Party	Candidate	Votes	%
Independent	Toby Barker		
Total votes			

=== Official campaign websites ===
- Toby Barker (I)

== Meridian ==
2025 Meridian mayoral election
- June 3, 2025
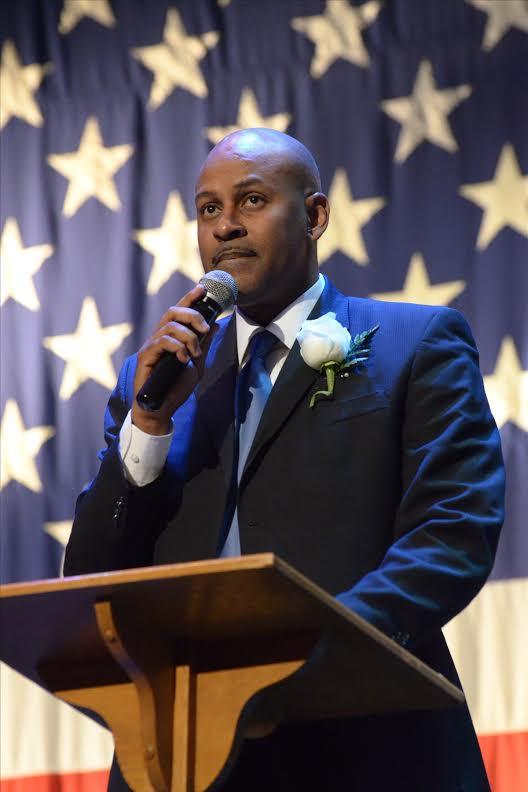

Candidate	Percy Bland	Derik Boler	Jimmy Copeland
Party	Democratic	Republican	Independent
Incumbent Mayor
Jimmie Smith
Democratic

The incumbent mayor of Meridian, Mississippi is Democrat Jimmie Smith, serving since 2021. He was last elected in 2021 with 62.6% of the vote. Smith ran for re-election but was defeated in the Democratic primary by former two-term mayor Percy Bland.

=== Democratic primary ===
==== Nominee ====
- Percy Bland, former mayor (2013–2021)

==== Eliminated in primary ====
- Ty Bell, incumbent city council member
- Rita Jack, former police officer
- Jimmie Smith, incumbent mayor (2021–present)

==== Results ====
2025 Meridian mayoral Democratic primary election (unofficial results)
Party	Candidate	Votes	%
Democratic	Percy Bland	2,673	67.21%
Democratic	Jimmie Smith	822	20.67%
Democratic	Rita Jack	295	7.42%
Democratic	Ty Bell	187	4.70%
Total votes		3,977	100.00%

=== Republican primary ===
==== Nomine ====
- Derik Boler

=== Minor party and independent candidates ===
The following candidate has filed to be on the general election ballot awaiting certification:

- Jimmy Copeland (Independent)

=== General election ===
2025 Meridian mayoral election
Party	Candidate	Votes	%
Democratic	Percy Bland	3,174	50.78%
Independent	Jimmy Copeland	3,076	49.22%
Total votes		6,250	100.00

=== Official campaign websites ===
- Ty Bell (D, eliminated)
- Rita Jack (D, eliminated)

== Olive Branch ==
2025 Olive Branch mayoral election
- June 3, 2025
Candidate	Ken Adams
Party	Republican
Incumbent Mayor
Ken Adams
Republican

The incumbent mayor of Olive Branch, Mississippi is Republican Ken Adams, serving since 2021. He is running completely unopposed for a second term. He won his last election in 2021 with 67.2% of the vote.

=== Republican primary ===
==== Nominee ====
- Ken Adams, incumbent mayor (2021–present)

=== General election ===
2025 Olive Branch mayoral election
Party	Candidate	Votes	%
Republican	Ken Adams (incumbent)	Unopposed	
Total votes			

== Southaven ==
2025 Southaven mayoral election
- June 3, 2025
Candidate	Darren Musselwhite
Party	Republican
Incumbent Mayor
Darren Musselwhite
Republican

The incumbent mayor of Southaven, Mississippi is Republican Darren Musselwhite, serving since 2013. He is running for a fourth term. He won his last election in 2021 with 64.5 percent of the vote.

=== Republican primary ===
The following candidates have filed to be on the Republican primary election ballot awaiting certification:

- Tommy Henley, independent candidate for mayor in 2021
- Darren Musselwhite, incumbent mayor (2013–present)

==== Results ====
2025 Southaven mayoral Republican primary election (unofficial results)
Party	Candidate	Votes	%
Republican	Darren Musselwhite (incumbent)	1,865	80.23%
Republican	Tommy Henley	460	19.79%
Total votes		2,325	100.00%

=== General election ===
2025 Southaven mayoral election
Party	Candidate	Votes	%
Republican	Darren Musselwhite (incumbent)	Unopposed	
Total votes			

=== Official campaign websites ===
- Darren Musselwhite (R)

== Tupelo ==
2025 Tupelo mayoral election
- June 3, 2025
Candidate	Todd Jordan
Party	Republican
Incumbent Mayor
Todd Jordan
Republican

The incumbent mayor of Tupelo, Mississippi is Republican Todd Jordan, serving since 2021. He is running for a second term. He won his last election in 2021 with 62.3 percent of the vote.

=== Republican primary ===
==== Nominee ====
- Todd Jordan, incumbent mayor (2021–present)

==== Eliminated in primary ====
- Rob Chambers, executive director of the Conservative Coalition of Mississippi

==== Results ====
2025 Tupelo mayoral Republican primary election (unofficial results)
Party	Candidate	Votes	%
Republican	Todd Jordan (incumbent)	3,065	83.77%
Republican	Rob Chambers	594	16.23%
Total votes		3,659	100.00%

=== General election ===
2025 Tupelo mayoral election
Party	Candidate	Votes	%
Republican	Todd Jordan (incumbent)	Unopposed	
Total votes			

== Philadelphia ==
2025 Philadelphia, Mississippi mayoral election
- June 3, 2025
Nominee	Jim Fulton	Leroy Clemmons
Party	Republican	Democratic
Incumbent Mayor
James Young
Democratic

The incumbent mayor of Philadelphia, Mississippi is Democrat James Young, serving since 2009.

=== Democratic primary ===
==== Nominee ====
- Leroy Clemmons

==== Eliminated in runoff ====
- Cassie Henson Hickman

==== Eliminated in primary ====
- James Young, incumbent mayor (2009–present)

==== Results ====
2025 Philadelphia, Mississippi mayoral Democratic primary election
Party	Candidate	Primary Apr. 1, 2025		Runoff (unofficial) Apr. 22, 2025	
Democratic	Leroy Clemmons	249	33.7%	379	52.3%
Democratic	Cassie Henson Hickman	247	33.4%	345	47.7%
Democratic	James Young (incumbent)	233	32.9%	Eliminated	
Total		739	100.00%	724	100.00

=== Republican primary ===
==== Nominee ====
- Jim Fulton, Ward 2 alderman (2013-present)

=== General election ===
2025 Philadelphia, Mississippi mayoral election
Party	Candidate	Votes	%
Republican	Jim Fulton	942	51.48%
Democratic	Leroy Clemmons	888	48.52%
Total votes		1,830	100.00
Republican gain from Democratic			

=== Official campaign websites ===
- Leroy Clemons for Mayor (D)
- Cassie Henson Hickman for Mayor (D, eliminated)

== Madison ==
2025 Madison, Mississippi mayoral election
- June 3, 2025
Candidate	Mary Hawkins Butler
Party	Republican
Incumbent Mayor
Mary Hawkins Butler
Republican

The incumbent mayor of Madison, Mississippi is Republican Mary Hawkins Butler, serving since 1981. She is running for a twelfth term.

=== Republican primary ===
- Mary Hawkins Butler, incumbent mayor (2021–present)

==== Results ====
2025 Madison mayoral election
Party	Candidate	Votes	%
Republican	Mary Hawkins Butler (incumbent)	Unopposed	

=== General election ===
Because no one else qualified to run for mayor, this election is automatically cancelled, and Butler wins by default.

== Vicksburg ==
2025 Vicksburg, Mississippi mayoral election
- June 3, 2025
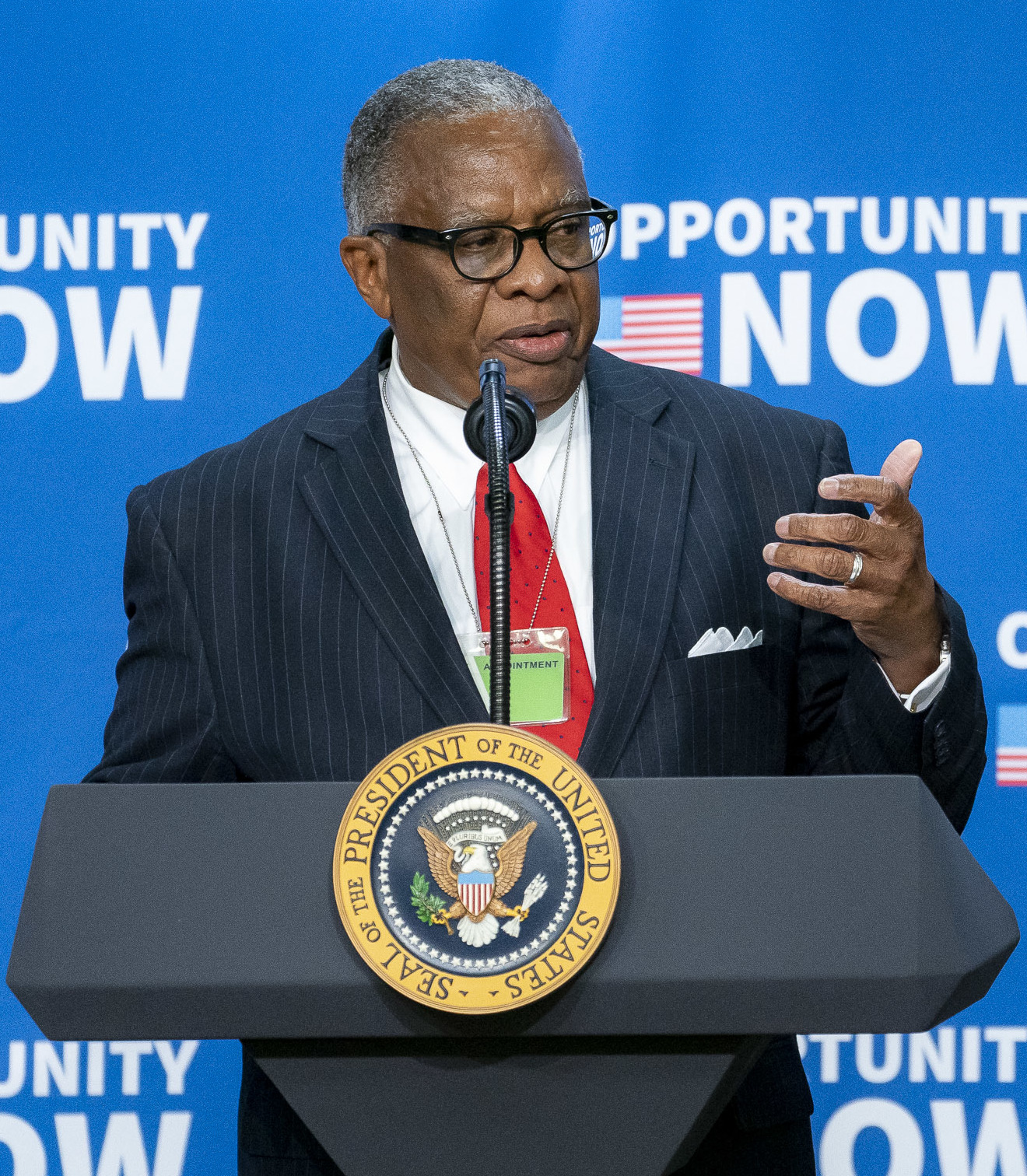
Candidate	George Flaggs Jr.	Willis Thompson
Party	Independent	Democratic
Incumbent Mayor
George Flaggs Jr.
Independent

The incumbent mayor of Vicksburg, Mississippi is Independent, George Flaggs Jr. serving since 2013. She is running for a fourth term.

=== Candidates ===
- George Flaggs Jr., incumbent mayor (2013–present)

=== General election ===
==== Results ====
2025 Vicksburg mayoral election
Party	Candidate	Votes	%
Democratic	Willis Thompson	1,795	44.08%
Independent	George Flaggs Jr. (incumbent)	1,719	42.22%
Independent	Kasman Masset	558	13.70%
Democratic gain from Independent			
