= 2014 Jackson mayoral election =

← 2013	April 22, 2014	2017 →
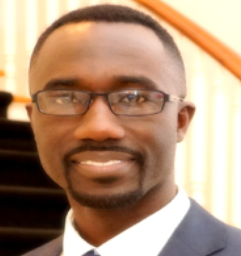

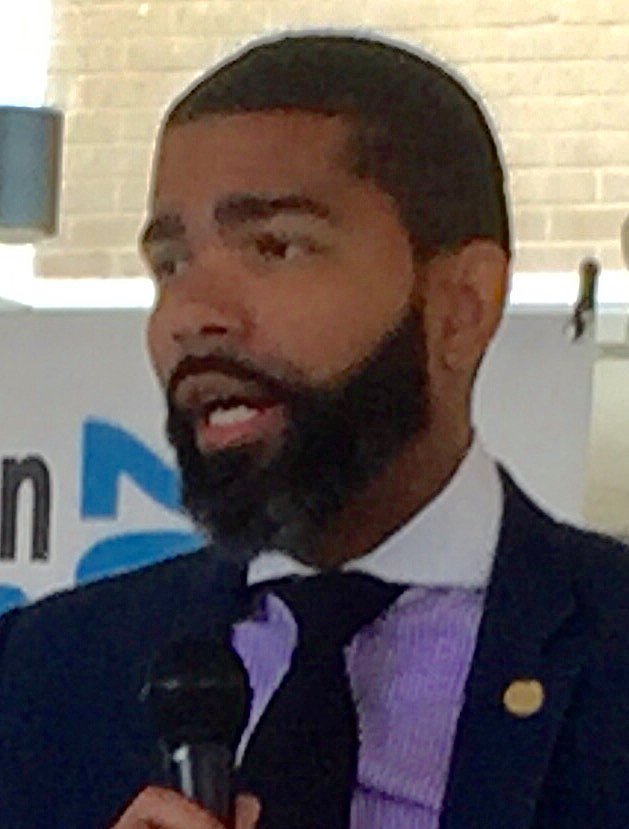
Candidate	Tony Yarber	Chokwe Antar Lumumba
Party	Democratic	Democratic
Popular vote	20,463	17,545
Percentage	53.84%	46.16%

The 2014 mayoral election in Jackson, Mississippi took place on April 22, 2014. It was necessitated after the death of incumbent mayor Chokwe Lumumba. Councilman Tony Yarber defeated the late Lumumba's son Chokwe Antar Lumumba in a runoff. Other candidates in the race included former mayor Harvey Johnson, Jr., city council members Melvin Priester and Margaret Barrett-Simon, and state senator John Horhn.

== Results ==
Special election, April 8, 2014
Party	Candidate	Votes	%
Democratic	Chokwe Antar Lumumba	10,326	31.09
Democratic	Tony Yarber	10,317	31.06
Democratic	Melvin Priester, Jr.	4,934	14.85
Democratic	Margaret Barrett-Simon	3,573	10.76
Democratic	John Horhn	1,666	5.02
Democratic	Harvey Johnson, Jr.	1,487	4.48
Democratic	Regina Quinn	756	2.28
Democratic	Gwendolyn Ward Osborne Chapman	41	0.12
Independent	Kenneth A. Swarts	35	0.11
Democratic	Albert Wilson	26	0.08
Independent	Francis P. Smith, Jr.	24	0.07
Democratic	John E. Reed	20	0.06
Democratic	Rodrick "Rod" Walker	13	0.04
Total votes		33,218	100.00

Special election runoff, April 22, 2014
Party	Candidate	Votes	%
Democratic	Tony Yarber	20,463	53.84
Democratic	Chokwe Antar Lumumba	17,545	46.16
Total votes		38,008	100.00
