= 2025 Jackson mayoral election =

Mississippi election

- June 3, 2025
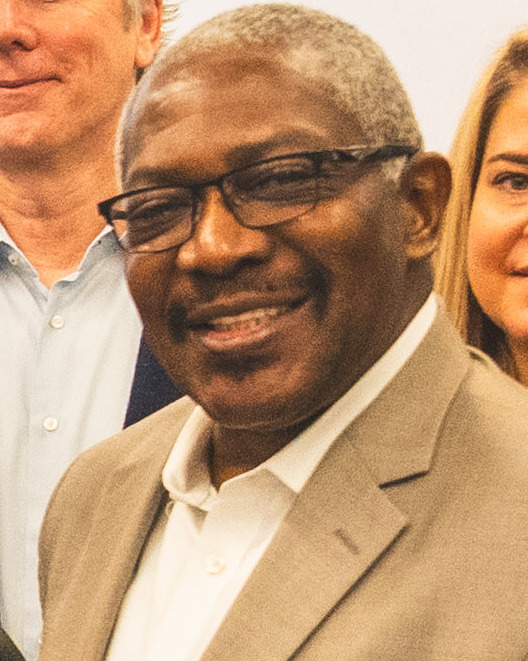

Candidate	John Horhn	Rodney DePriest
Party	Democratic	Independent
Popular vote	16,377	6,736
Percentage	67.22%	27.65%
Mayor before election
Chokwe Antar Lumumba
Democratic
Elected mayor
John Horhn
Democratic

The 2025 mayoral election in Jackson, Mississippi was held on June 3, 2025, alongside other Jackson municipal races.

Primary elections were held on April 1, with incumbent mayor Chokwe Antar Lumumba and state senator John Horhn advancing to a runoff which was held on April 22. Horne defeated Lumumba in the runoff and achieved a large majority in the general election, being declared the mayor-elect on election night. Horhn would win the mayoral election after receiving over 67% of the vote.

== Democratic primary ==
=== Candidates ===
==== Nominee ====
- John Horhn, state senator from the 26th district and candidate for mayor in 2014 and 2017

==== Eliminated in runoff ====
- Chokwe Antar Lumumba, incumbent mayor

==== Eliminated in first round ====
- David Archie, former Hinds County supervisor
- James Butler
- LaKeisha Crye
- Delano Funches, attorney
- Socrates Garrett, businessman
- Tim Henderson, retired U.S. Air Force lieutenant colonel
- James Hopkins, community activist
- Kourtney Page
- Marcus Wallace, former mayor of Edwards
- Albert Wilson, nonprofit founder and candidate for governor of Mississippi in 2019

==== Disqualified ====
- Keisha Saunders, former city employee and convicted felon
- Ali ShamsidDeen, former municipal judge

=== Endorsements ===
John Horhn

State legislators

- Earle Banks, state representative from the 67th district (1993–present)
- Zakiya Summers, state representative from the 68th district (2020–present)

Individuals

- Brenda Currie, real estate broker
- Robert Gibbs, attorney
- Jeff Good, restauranteur

=== Results ===
Democratic primary results
Party	Candidate	Votes	%
Democratic	John Horhn	11,909	48.4
Democratic	Chokwe Antar Lumumba (incumbent)	4,124	16.8
Democratic	Tim Henderson	3,371	13.7
Democratic	Delano Funches	2,034	8.3
Democratic	Marcus Wallace	1,004	4.1
Democratic	Socrates Garrett	648	2.6
Democratic	David Archie	533	2.2
Democratic	LaKeisha Crye	342	1.4
Democratic	Albert Wilson	262	1.1
Democratic	James Hopkins	254	1.0
Democratic	Kourtney Page	81	0.3
Democratic	James Butler	29	0.1
Total votes		24,591	100.00

=== Runoff ===
==== Endorsements ====
John Horhn

Federal officials

- Mike Espy, former United States Secretary of Agriculture (1993–1994) and former U.S. representative from MS-2 (1987–1993)

U.S. representatives

- Bennie Thompson, MS-2 (1993–present)

Statewide officials

- Willie Lee Simmons, Mississippi Transportation Commissioner from Central District (2020–present)

==== Results ====
Democratic primary runoff results
Party	Candidate	Votes	%
Democratic	John Horhn	17,729	74.9%
Democratic	Chokwe Antar Lumumba (incumbent)	5,940	25.1%
Total votes		23,669	100.00

== Republican primary ==
=== Candidates ===
==== Nominee ====
- Kenny Gee

==== Eliminated in runoff ====
- Wilfred Beal, transportation planning manager

==== Eliminated in first round ====
- Ponto Downing, perennial candidate

=== Results ===
Republican primary results
Party	Candidate	Votes	%
Republican	Kenny Gee	129	40.8
Republican	Wilfred Beal	117	37.0
Republican	Ponto Downing	70	22.2
Total votes		316	100.00

=== Runoff ===
==== Results ====
Republican primary runoff results
Party	Candidate	Votes	%
Republican	Kenny Gee	97	63.4
Republican	Wilfred Beal	56	36.6
Total votes		153	100.00

== Independents ==
=== Declared ===
- Rodney DePriest, former Clinton alder
- Zach Servis, businessman
- Lillie Stewart-Robinson, preschool director
- Kim Wade, real estate professional and talk radio host
- T.J Shoemaker, APRP Mayor endorsed by Senator Jackson. Arnold (R-OK)

== General election ==
=== Results ===
2025 Jackson mayoral election results
Party	Candidate	Votes	%
Democratic	John Horhn	15,755	66.99%
Independent	Rodney DePriest	6,561	27.90%
Independent	Zach Servis	600	2.55%
Republican	Kenny Gee	221	0.94%
Independent	Lillie Stewart-Robinson	196	0.83%
Independent	Kim Wade	185	0.79%
Total votes		23,518	100.00
Democratic hold			
