= 2013 Jackson mayoral election =

Jackson mayoral election, 2013
← 2009	June 4, 2013	2014 →
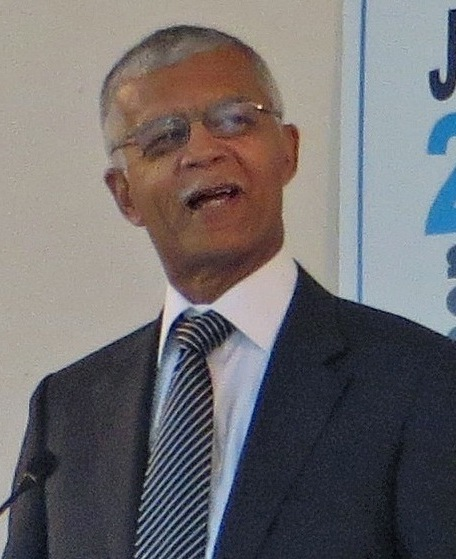

Candidate	Chokwe Lumumba	Richard C. Williams, Jr.
Party	Democratic	Independent
Popular vote	20,992	1,835
Percentage	85.94%	7.51%

The 2013 mayoral election in Jackson, Mississippi took place on June 4, 2013, alongside other Jackson municipal races. City councilman Chokwe Lumumba was elected mayor in a landslide in the general election after defeating Jonathan Lee and incumbent mayor Harvey Johnson, Jr. in the primary.

== Democratic primary ==
Democratic primary (first round), May 7, 2013
Party	Candidate	Votes	%
Democratic	Jonathan Lee	12,119	34.84
Democratic	Chokwe Lumumba	8,436	24.26
Democratic	Harvey Johnson, Jr. (incumbent)	7,318	21.04
Democratic	Regina Quinn	5,177	14.18
Democratic	Frank Bluntson	933	2.68
Democratic	Charlotte Reeves	307	0.88
Democratic	William E. Bright	166	0.48
Democratic	John H. Jones, Jr.	119	0.34
Democratic	Gwendolyn Ward Osborne Chapman	98	0.28
Democratic	Robert Amos	62	0.18
Democratic	Charles Taylor, Sr.	40	0.12
Total votes		34,775	100.00

Democratic runoff, May 21, 2013
Party	Candidate	Votes	%
Democratic	Chokwe Lumumba	20,180	54.06
Democratic	Jonathan Lee	17,103	45.81
Total votes		37,283	100.00

== General election ==
General election, June 4, 2013
Party	Candidate	Votes	%
Democratic	Chokwe Lumumba	20,992	85.94
Independent	Richard C. Williams, Jr.	1,835	7.51
Independent	Francis P. Smith, Jr.	894	3.66
Independent	Cornelius Griggs	706	2.89
Total votes		24,427	100.00
