= 2021 Jackson mayoral election =

- June 8, 2021
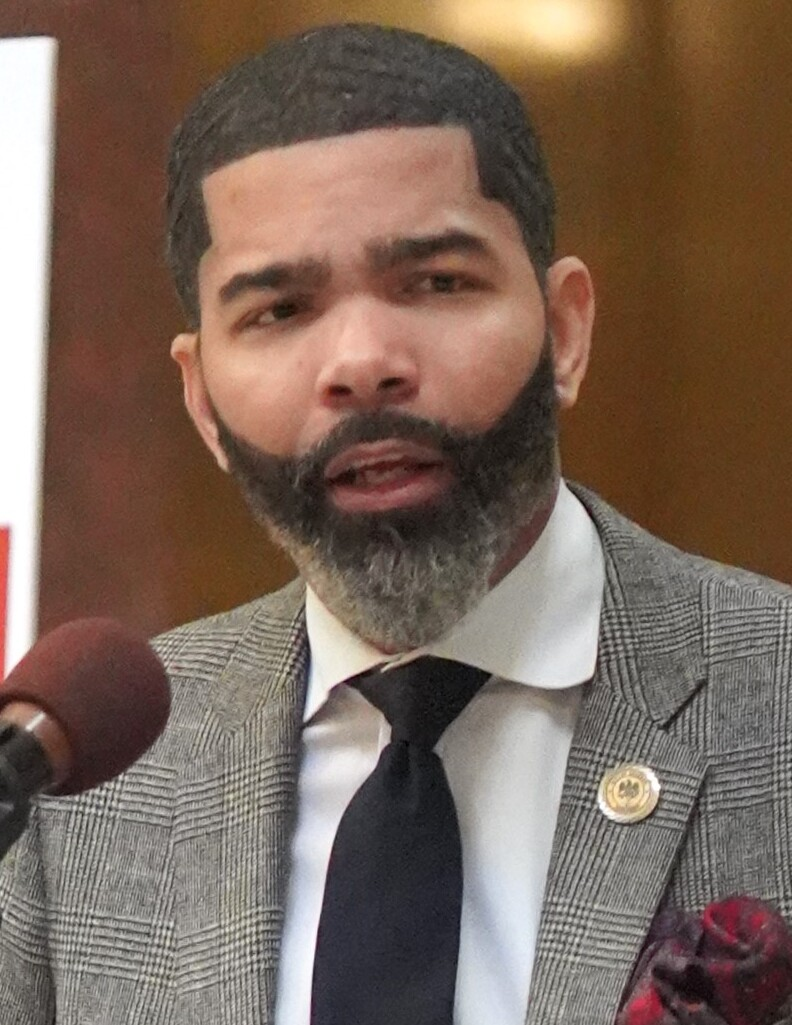

Candidate	Chokwe Antar Lumumba	Les Tannehill	Charlotte Reeves
Party	Democratic	Independent	Independent
Popular vote	13,220	2,541	1,705
Percentage	69.1%	13.3%	8.9%
Mayor before election
Chokwe Antar Lumumba
Democratic
Elected mayor
Chokwe Antar Lumumba
Democratic

The 2021 mayoral election in Jackson, Mississippi took place on June 8, 2021, alongside other Jackson municipal races. Primary elections took place on April 6, and the primary runoff was scheduled on April 27. Incumbent mayor Chokwe Antar Lumumba was re-elected to a second term in office with 69.1% of the vote.

== Democratic primary ==
=== Candidates ===
==== Qualified ====
- Chokwe Antar Lumumba, incumbent mayor
- Patty Patterson, candidate for the Mississippi House of Representatives in 2015
- Kenneth Wilson, former firefighter

=== Endorsements ===
Chokwe Antar Lumumba (incumbent)

U.S. senators

- Bernie Sanders, U.S. senator from Vermont (2007–present); U.S. representative from VT-AL (1991–2007); mayor of Burlington, Vermont (1981–1989); chair of the Senate Budget Committee (2021–present); candidate for president in 2016 and 2020 (Independent)

=== Results ===
Democratic primary
Party	Candidate	Votes	%
Democratic	Chokwe Antar Lumumba (incumbent)	13,735	69.23
Democratic	Kenneth Wilson	3,689	18.59
Democratic	Patty Patterson	2,417	12.81
Total votes		19,841	100.00

== Republican primary ==
=== Candidates ===
==== Qualified ====
- Ponto Downing, activist and perennial candidate
- Jason Wells, police officer, fireman, and nominee for mayor in 2017

=== Results ===
Republican primary
Party	Candidate	Votes	%
Republican	Jason Wells	293	73.62
Republican	Ponto Downing	105	26.38
Total votes		398	100.00

== Independents ==
=== Qualified ===
- Shafeqah BigMama Lodree, businesswoman
- Charlotte Reeves, businesswoman and perennial candidate
- Les Tannehill, former Hinds County sheriff's deputy and candidate for Hinds County sheriff in 2015

== General election ==
=== Results ===
General election results
Party	Candidate	Votes	%
Democratic	Chokwe Antar Lumumba (incumbent)	13,220	69.1
Independent	Les Tannehill	2,541	13.3
Independent	Charlotte Reeves	1,705	8.9
Independent	Shafeqah BigMama Lodree	805	4.2
Republican	Jason Wells	790	4.1
Total votes		19,134	100.00
Democratic hold			
