= 2009 Jackson mayoral election =

← 2005	June 2, 2009	2013 →
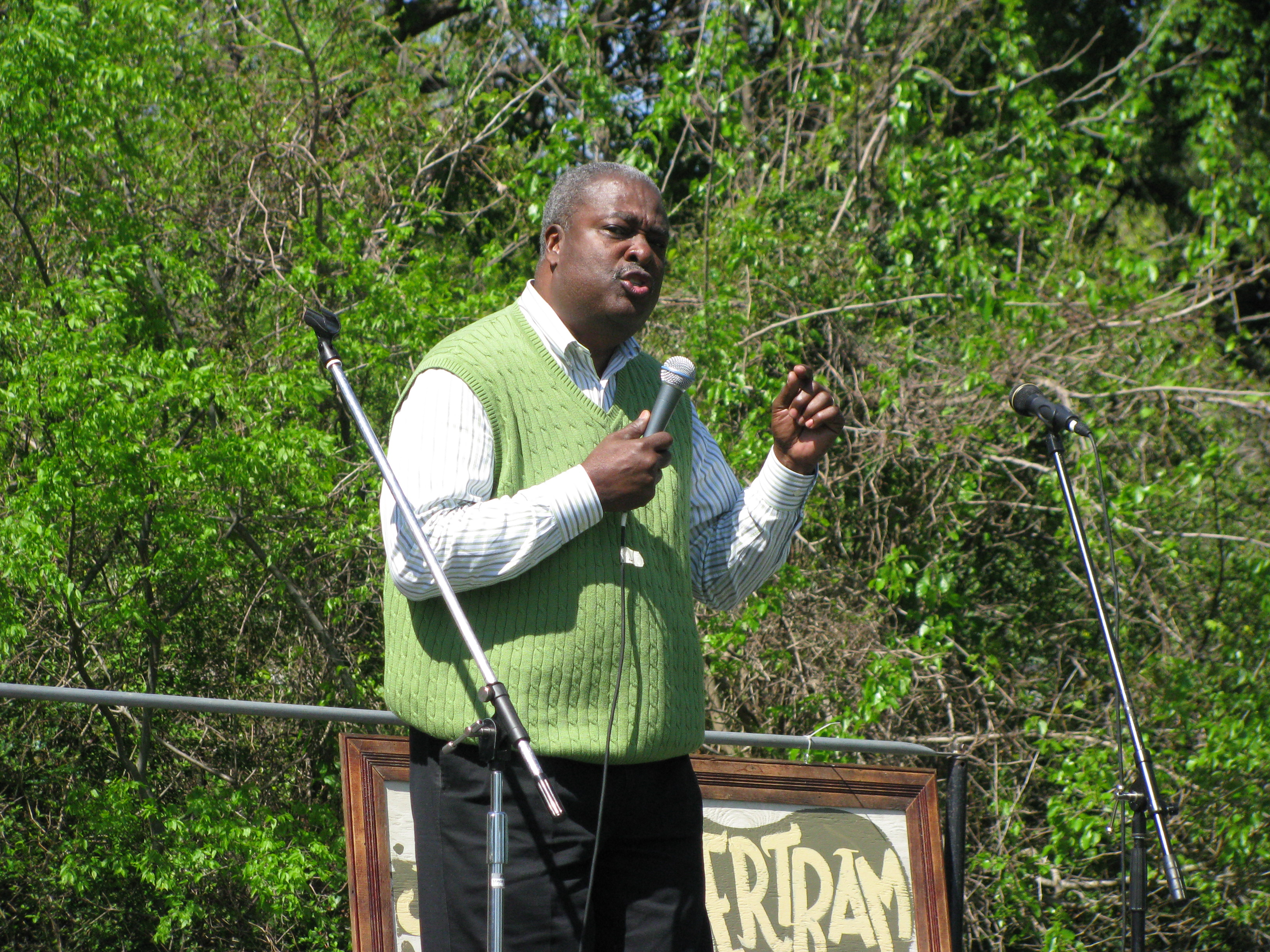
Candidate	Harvey Johnson, Jr.
Party	Democratic
Popular vote	21,692
Percentage	85.39%

The 2009 mayoral election in Jackson, Mississippi took place on June 2, 2009, alongside other Jackson municipal races. Former mayor Harvey Johnson, Jr. was elected after defeating councilman Marshand Crisler and incumbent mayor Frank Melton in the primary. Melton died on May 7, 2009, two days after not making the runoff in the Democratic primary.

== Results ==
Democratic primary, May 5, 2009
Party	Candidate	Votes	%
Democratic	Harvey Johnson, Jr.	9,380	27.75
Democratic	Marshand Crisler	9,097	26.91
Democratic	Frank Melton (incumbent)	6,151	18.20
Democratic	John Horhn	5,922	17.52
Democratic	Robert L. Johnson	1,380	4.08
Democratic	Eddie J. Fair	1,268	3.75
Democratic	Brenda R. Scott	288	0.85
Democratic	John H. Jones, Jr.	169	0.50
Democratic	Dorothy "Dot" Benford	99	0.29
Democratic	Jabari A. Toins	46	0.14
Total votes		33,800	100.00

Democratic runoff, May 19, 2009
Party	Candidate	Votes	%
Democratic	Harvey Johnson, Jr.	20,963	63.01
Democratic	Marshand Crisler	12,308	36.99
Total votes		33,271	100.00

General election, June 2, 2009
Party	Candidate	Votes	%
Democratic	Harvey Johnson, Jr.	21,692	85.39
Independent	Rick Whitlow	2,198	8.65
Independent	Charlotte Reeves	661	2.60
Independent	David L. Archie	436	1.72
Republican	George Owen Lambus	292	1.15
Independent	Robert Amos	124	0.49
Total votes		25,403	100.00
