= George Floyd protests in Mississippi =

Civil unrest in 2020 following the murder of George Floyd

- Part of George Floyd protests
- Date: May 28 – June 6, 2020 (1 week and 2 days)
- Location: Mississippi, United States
- Caused by: Police brutality; Institutional racism against African Americans; Reaction to the murder of George Floyd; Economic, racial and social inequality

This is a list of protests related to the murder of George Floyd in Mississippi, United States.

== Locations ==
=== Biloxi ===
On May 30, about 50 people protested peacefully with signs and bullhorns along Beach Boulevard in front of the Biloxi Lighthouse. More than 60 demonstrated in the same place on May 31 as passing motorists honked horns in solidarity.

=== Gulfport ===
On June 6, hundreds of protesters gathered in Jones Park and marched down Highway 90 in support of Black Lives Matter. The protest remained peaceful, despite rumors that bricks were present to rile up emotions.

=== Hattiesburg ===
About 30 protesters, waving signs and chanting, marched peacefully on May 31 down Hardy Street, escorted by city police cars. An organizer of the event marched with her hands cuffed symbolically behind her back.

About two weeks later, another protest was held, this one with over 1,000 participants.

=== Jackson ===
On Friday, May 29, about 25 demonstrators peacefully protested in front of the Mississippi State Capitol and marched through downtown Jackson. On June 6, between 3,000 and 5,000 protesters gathered for a Black Lives Matter rally in front of the state capitol. Jackson Mayor Chokwe Antar Lumumba attended the rally. Mississippi Highway Patrol distributed masks to protesters.

=== Meridian ===
On June 2, a peaceful protest took place on North Hills Street, starting with four protesters and growing into the evening.

Another protest was held on June 6 with several hundred protesters.

=== Oxford ===
About 300 people peacefully demonstrated and marched around The Square for a couple of hours on May 30. That same afternoon, Ole Miss university police arrested a white public school teacher for vandalizing a Confederate statue on campus with spray paint.

=== Petal ===
On May 28 at least 200 people protested outside Petal City Hall on Friday night, demanding that Mayor Hal Marx resign after he made a comment defending the police regarding George Floyd's murder and saying "I didn't see anything unreasonable." One elderly woman walked three miles (4.8 km) with symbolic chains around her feet to get to the protest. Protests in Petal continued through the weekend and protesters showed up Tuesday June 2 at the city's Board of Aldermen meeting to demand Marx's resignation.

=== Starkville ===
On June 6, thousands of protesters marched from Unity Park to the Amphitheater at Mississippi State University, lying down on their stomachs for eight minutes and forty-six seconds to honor George Floyd.

=== Tupelo ===
Several hundred people protested peacefully at the Tupelo Fairpark on May 30.

=== Vicksburg ===
On June 5, a large peaceful protest took place as demonstrators marched from the Vicksburg Police Department through the streets of downtown to protest the murder of George Floyd. The event was organized in part by the NAACP.
