= Stallo, Mississippi =

Unincorporated community in Mississippi, US

- Unincorporated community
- Location within Mississippi Location within the United States
- Coordinates: 32°55′12″N 89°06′02″W
- Country: United States
- State: Mississippi
- County: Neshoba
- Elevation: 489 ft (149 m)
- Time zone: UTC-6 (Central (CST))
  - Summer (DST): UTC-5 (CDT)
- Area code: 601
- GNIS feature ID: 692242

Stallo (also known as Maurine), is an unincorporated community located in Neshoba County, Mississippi, United States. Stallo is approximately 10 miles (16 km) north of Philadelphia along Mississippi Highway 15.

Stallo is located on the former Gulf, Mobile and Ohio Railroad. The community was known as Maurine from 1905 until 1908. In 1910, Stallo had three sawmills, two general stores, a drugstore, and hardware store. From 1908 until 1953, Stallo had its own post office. During its 45 years of the operation, five people served as postmaster.

Stallo is served by the Stallo Volunteer Fire Department.

James Young, the first African-American mayor of Philadelphia, Mississippi, was raised on a farm in Stallo, Mississippi.
