= Jackson, Mississippi, water crisis =

2022 water crisis in Jackson, Mississippi, U.S.

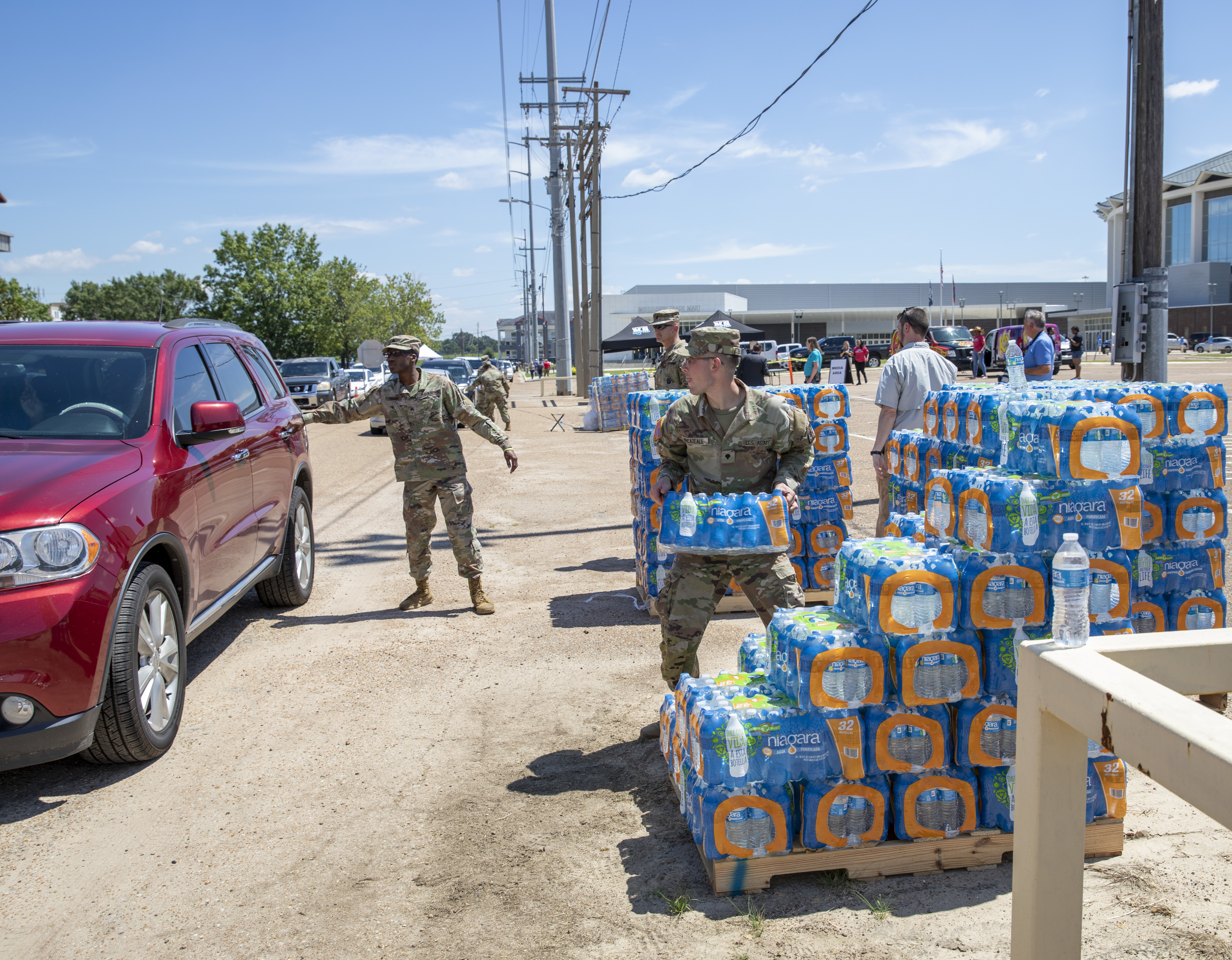
- The Mississippi National Guard distributing bottled water at the Mississippi State Fairgrounds, September 2022
- Date: August–November 2022
- Location: Jackson, Mississippi, U.S.; 32°17′56″N 90°11′05″W
- Type: Water shortage
- Cause: July–August 2022 United States floods (partial)

A public health crisis in and around the city of Jackson, Mississippi, began in late August 2022 after the Pearl River flooded due to severe storms in the state. The flooding caused the O. B. Curtis Water Treatment Plant, the city's largest water treatment facility, which was already running on backup pumps due to failures the month prior, to stop the treatment of drinking water indefinitely. This resulted in approximately 150,000 residents of the city being left without access to safe drinking water. Mississippi Governor Tate Reeves issued a state of emergency and United States President Joe Biden declared a federal disaster to trigger federal aid. On October 31 the Environmental Protection Agency declared the water safe to drink and Reeves withdrew the state of emergency on November 22. The crisis triggered a political debate regarding racial discrimination, infrastructure neglect, and shifting local demographics.

== Background ==
=== Jackson water system ===
Jackson is the largest city in the U.S. state of Mississippi. Its water system includes more than 71,000 water connections and supplies water over about 150 square miles of territory, including the city of Jackson, the city of Byram, various other locations in Hinds County, and an automobile factory near Canton. In addition to Jackson, the municipal sewer system serves sections of Hinds, Rankin and Madison counties. The system draws water from the Ross Barnett Reservoir and the Pearl River. The reservoir water is treated by the O. B. Curtis Water Treatment Plant, while the river water is treated by the J.H. Fewell Water Treatment Plant. The city also maintains two groundwater wells for supply. Sewage is treated by three treatment plants.

=== Financial issues and treatment problems ===
The city's drinking water treatment system had problems for years before the crisis. In 2010, a winter storm caused several water main breaks and a widespread outage. City hospitals increased privately owned well capacity as a response to that emergency, and as a result in the August 2022 crisis core medical services were able to continue operating with running water. In 2012, Jackson failed a U.S. Environmental Protection Agency (EPA) inspection enforcing Safe Drinking Water Act standards, resulting in a November 2012 settlement requiring that the city improve maintenance. Several efforts by city officials in the aftermath of the 2010 storm to secure money for improvements by bond issues and local option sales taxes were blocked or reduced in size by state officials.

A sizable water leak reported in 2016 was still unfixed in 2023 spewing city water into a crater alongside a golf course.

In February 2021, a winter storm shut down the O. B. Curtis Water Treatment Plant, leaving residents without water for a month. City leaders asked the state for $47 million for sewer repairs, but received only $3 million. The city and the EPA agreed on a repair plan in July 2021, but the city's water infrastructure continued to deteriorate. Residents complained of low water pressure and sewage floating in the streets. The city issued many boil water orders after the February storm.

A private contractor failed to send water bills to thousands of residents, and the governor vetoed an amnesty plan in 2020, but not in 2021. This action allowed the city to recover partial payments from some customers. In December 2021, the Environmental Protection Agency announced an allocation of $74.9 million from the Infrastructure Investment and Jobs Act to Mississippi for water infrastructure improvements. Mayor Chokwe Antar Lumumba estimated the cost of fully repairing the water system at $2 billion.

From 2017 to 2021, Jackson recorded an annual average of 55 breaks per 100 miles of water line, higher than the "safe" rate of 15 breaks or less. In July 2022, the EPA completed a report which detailed numerous issues with the municipal water utility including understaffing, high employee turnover, malfunctioning water meters, and an inability to properly issue bills to all customers. The city informed the EPA that it estimated that 50 percent of the water it supplied did not result in any revenue, either due to faulty metering or loss of water in the system. By the time of the water crisis, Jackson had about $191 million outstanding revenue bond debt for its water utility, and the utility's bonds had been rated at junk status. Due to the lack of requisite funding and staff, the city did not record water pressure over time, did not regularly flush its lines, did not maintain valves and hydrants, and did not cycle water through storage tanks to maintain appropriate chlorine levels.

In July 2022, damage inflicted at the Curtis treatment plant forced the water utility to switch to backup pumps. As a result, Jackson issued a boil water advisory on July 28. The order was still in effect when the August 2022 flooding arrived. In wake of the advisory, municipal officials in Byram began exploring the creation of an independent water utility for their city.

Jackson received $600 million from Congress following the approval of an appropriations omnibus funding bill. This bill was passed in December of 2022, and it was designed to lend aid to areas in the United States negatively impacted by natural disasters. Congressman Bennie Thompson and Senator Roger Wicker suggested that part of the funds should be lent to Jackson, Mississippi. Of that $600 million, $150 million must be allocated to technical assistance. This has to do with managing the water system itself. The other $450 million must be allocated to capital projects which are concrete, physical changes in infrastructure to the water system. Although this funding is vital for initial action towards repair and remediation, the total cost of fixing the system is approximately $2 billion dollars.

== Flooding ==
Heavy rain fell over parts of Mississippi the week prior to the crisis, with Walnut Grove observing 12 inches (300 millimeters) of precipitation. These storms caused flash flooding in the area, including Jackson, where Mayor Lumumba declared a local emergency on August 24. The immediate flash flooding receded that week, but water moving through streams and rivers caused the Pearl River to flood cresting at 35.37 feet (10.78 meters) on August 29 and not falling below the flood stage of 28 feet (8.5 m) until September 1. One home in Jackson was flooded and a few neighborhoods were evacuated as a precaution. The flooding led the Curtis plant to take an influx of water from the Barnett Reservoir. As a result, treatment methods were altered and the plant produced less clean water, causing pressure in the system to drop.

== Emergency ==
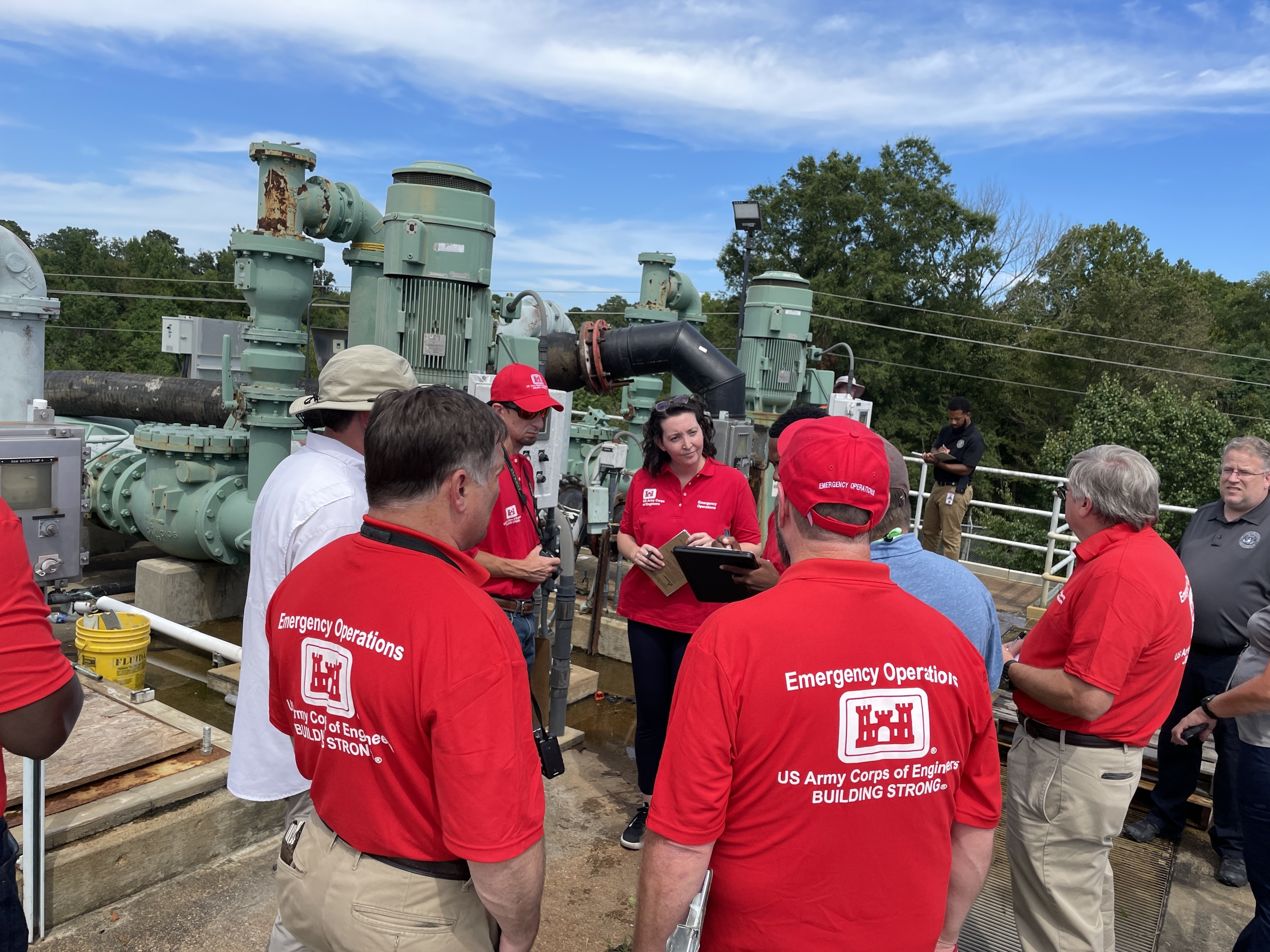
U.S. Army Corps of Engineers team performing assessments at the O. B. Curtis Water Treatment Plant, September 1, 2022

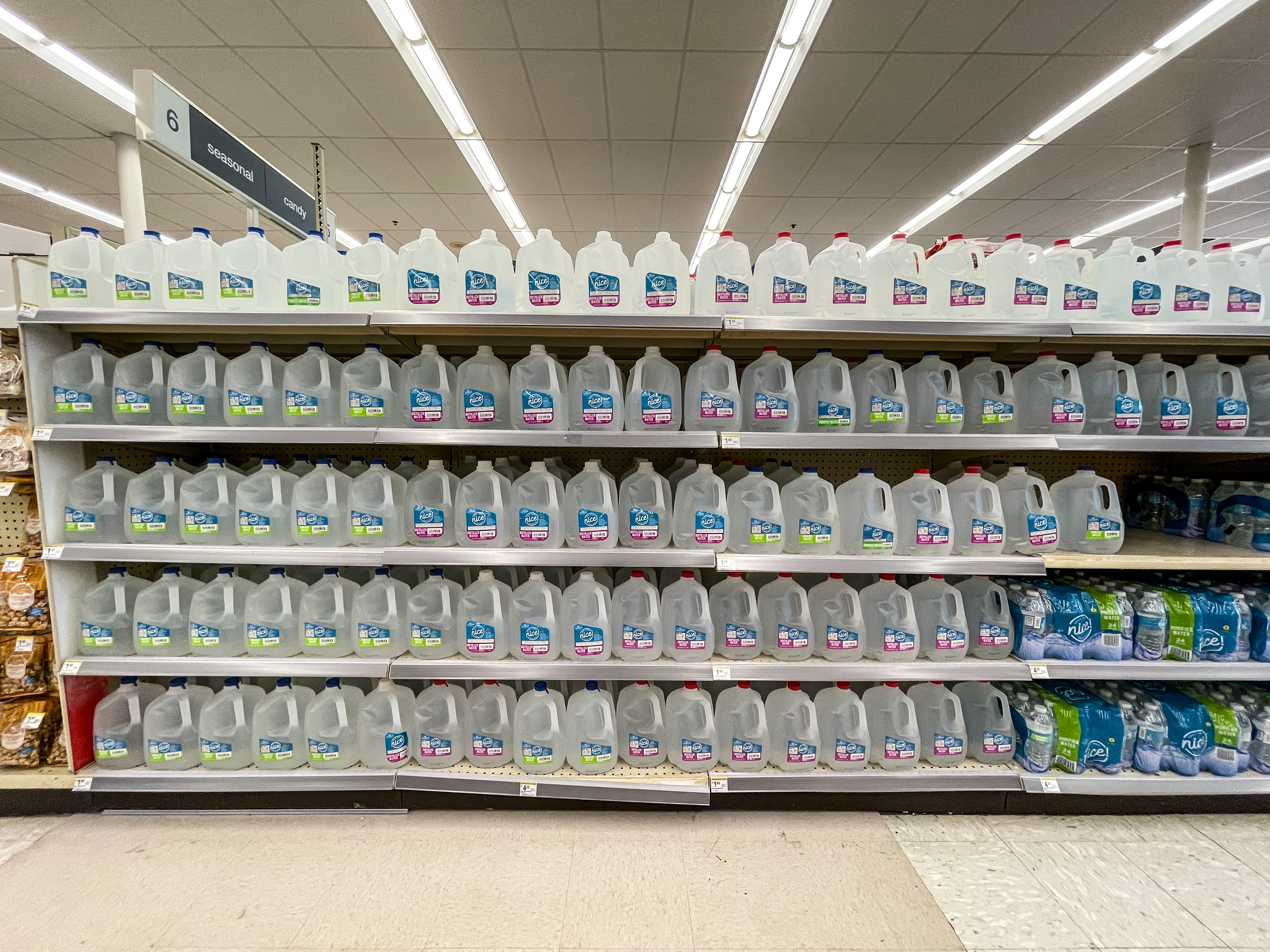
Bottles of water at a Walgreens in Jackson, Mississippi during the crisis

On August 29, 2022, Governor of Mississippi Tate Reeves declared the O. B. Curtis Water Treatment Plant on the verge of failure, and the state assumed control of its operations. Problems with pumps at the Fewell Plant meant that the city could not use it make up for the drop in water production from Curtis while repairs were underway there. The following day, most Jackson residents did not receive running water, and Reeves issued a state of emergency. He deployed 600 members of the Mississippi National Guard on August 31 to help distribute bottled water and hand sanitizer. At Reeves' request, President Joe Biden declared Jackson to be a disaster area, allowing the Federal Emergency Management Agency to send resources to the city and to help pay for the response.

The lack of water forced many stores and restaurants in Jackson to close, while local schools and universities moved to virtual learning. Other Mississippi communities organized drives to donate water and other supplies to the city's residents and offered accommodations for some people displaced by the crisis. Most of the city's hospitals had independent water supplies and were not affected by the crisis. The exception, Merit Health Central, used water brought in by trucks to remain operational, a practice it had initiated when the July boil advisory was issued.

A well dug at the Mississippi Fairgrounds after the 2021 crisis was used to source emergency water locally. Rented pumps were used to increase water pressure, and the city considered using a contractor or retired operators to deal with a chronic staffing shortage.

On September 4, Jackson officials announced that they had restored adequate water pressure to most of the system. The following day Governor Reeves said that conditions at the water treatment plant had improved with the pumped out water being much cleaner. For long term solutions, Reeves stated that the state was considering a range of solutions, including privatization of the system and forming a commission to oversee failed water systems. On September 15, Jackson's water supply was fully restored and the boil advisory was withdrawn, though the state Department of Health still advised precautions for pregnant women and children.

On September 19, the Curtis plant suffered a chlorine leak, leading the staff to evacuate the facility for a few hours. On September 26, Jackson officials issued a new boil advisory for 1,200 water customers. Of these, 1,000 were in Byram, where a contractor had accidentally broken a water line. The rest were in north Jackson, Belhaven, and Eastover, who were impacted by over 200 breaks in various water lines due to increasing water pressure in the system. On September 27, officials stated they were experiencing significant water leaks throughout system, and overall water production was at a stable level at the O.B. Curtis plant. On October 20, the City of Jackson, collaborating with the U.S. Department of Justice and the EPA, released a request for proposals for bids on the operation, maintenance, and management of the Curtis and Fewell water treatment plants, tanks and well facilities, as a one-year emergency agreement.

On October 31, the EPA declared that water being treated at both the Curtis and Fewell plants was safe to drink. On November 22, Reeves withdrew the state of emergency.

== Political debate ==
The water crisis triggered a political debate regarding racial discrimination, infrastructure neglect, and shifting local demographics. Some commentators have charged the failing water system is an example of environmental racism, with the state failing to support infrastructure in its capital city. Critics point to Jackson's presence as a Democratic-leaning city with an overwhelming African American majority population in a Republican state with a white majority state legislature. Shifting demographics in the late-20th and early-21st century, including white flight, reduced the city population, decreased the number of white residents as a proportion of the population, and led to an increase in the city's poverty rate. Wealthier suburbs have newer infrastructure, but Jackson itself is left with a smaller tax base to support its aging system. Governor Reeves, a Republican, started holding press conferences when the August 2022 crisis began without inviting Lumumba, the city's Democratic mayor.

Michael Guest, a Republican congressman representing parts of Jackson, pushed back on such criticism by placing the blame on political gridlock among the city's leadership. Reeves criticized Jackson for having longstanding issues regarding billing and staffing and for not coming up with a plan for recovery following previous events. Congressman Bennie Thompson, a Democrat who represents the parts of Jackson in the U.S. House of Representatives not in Guest's district, said on September 2 that if the city cannot demonstrate an ability to manage the water system adequately, they should not have the authority to do so.

The crisis has also spurred discussion about how climate change is expected to strain existing infrastructure in the United States. Writing for the American socialist publication Jacobin, Ryan Zickgraf states that the water crisis in Jackson can be attributed to decades of austerity and capital disinvestment.

== Connections to environmental justice ==
According to the Southern Poverty Law Center, systemic racism and oppression targeted the black community in Jackson and resulted in negligence and inaction. As of 2022 Jackson is about 80 percent black and 25 percent of residents are below the poverty line. Because of the water contamination those impacted are more susceptible to health problems such as low fertility rates, learning disabilities, and skin diseases. One research study found that white flight contributed to the water crisis. The results of the study show that white flight and Jim Crow politics weakened the economy of Jackson. The city of Jackson has requested support and funding from the federal government to fix the pipes. The governor of Mississippi, Tate Reeves, and the state declined these requests. The lack of funding from local and state governments has significantly slowed the process of fixing infrastructural problems. In an article on the Jackson water crisis and the effects of racism, the author outlines the issue in the context of environmental justice. Dr. Mizelle writes, “Jackson’s water crisis has been a “slow-moving disaster,” a result of decades of anti-Blackness, environmental racism, and historical inaction."

Geoscientist Qingmin Meng analyzed health inequities against black communities in Jackson, Mississippi, and found that the Jackson water crisis caused all 11 types of diseases as the dependent variable in the study. Meng explains that “the Jackson water crisis could increase the prevalence of 0.691% for asthma, 0.966% for kidney, 1.116% for mental health diseases, 1.562% for stroke, 2.275% for coronary heart disease,” in addition to other physical health diseases. The poorest communities are concentrated in Jackson, and they are suffering from adverse health effects. As shown in the results, diseases and health problems are worsened by the unsafe water supply. There has been consistent boil water notices and high lead concentrations in the drinking water. These health issues have been ignored by local and federal governments, and negatively added to the crisis. Tate Reeves, Mississippi's Republican governor, described the management of the two water plants, almost broken down as, “absolute and total incompetence." In contrast, Jackson’s Democratic mayor, Chokwe Antar Lumumba described Governor Reeve’s actions towards the issue as “racist” and “paternalistic.”

Some elected officials have pushed back on the idea that the crisis relates to environmental justice. Others, however, believe that the crisis has not been resolved because of environmental racism. Ashby Foote, republican city councilor, argued, “I don’t know what it’s necessarily productive to fall back into the narrative of, ‘This is the Whites being mean to a Black city, blah, blah, blah." On the other hand, the NAACP filed a civil rights complaint quoting public health experts that state, “contaminated drinking water, such as that in Jackson, contributes to higher rates and more severe incidences of illness and disease in Jackson than in other areas with better overall health baselines."

== Aftermath ==
Another boil water advisory had to be issued in late December 2022, when a winter storm froze and burst pipes in the city distribution system.

As of 2023, many Jackson residents refuse to use the city's water due to ongoing lead contamination and discoloration problems. In February 2023, documented evidence revealed Jackson homes not under a boil water advisory still had contaminated and discolored water. Many residents stated they will continue to boil water or use bottled water until the city's outdated water system is completely upgraded and more reliable. Since 2018, the city of Jackson has over 300 boil water notices and suffered over 7,300 water line breaks.

Repair costs are estimated to be up to $2 billion, with a full assessment of the water treatment plant expected to take about a year. Jackson received $35.6 million in federal funds (allocated by the state in November 2022) from the American Rescue Plan Act of 2021, matching an equal amount from city funds. In December 2022, Congress allocated $600 million for the Jackson water system in the Consolidated Appropriations Act, 2023.

In September 2022, the NAACP accused the state of racial discrimination in funding allocation in a complaint filed under Title VI of the Civil Rights Act of 1964.

Recently a temporary water pump was installed at O.B. Curtis, one of the main water plants. This should assist with the water pressure in pipes. The water system in the city is about 100 years old and deteriorating. A resident, Emmetta Jones shares that although her water pressure is adequate, the water is occasionally brown, and she hasn’t drunk the water in several years.

== See also ==
- Flint water crisis
- Water supply and sanitation in the United States
- Environmental racism in the United States
