= Charles Tillman (Mississippi politician) =

American politician

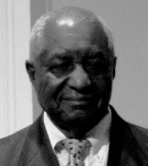

Mayor of Jackson, Mississippi
- In office February 25, 2014 – April 24, 2014
- Preceded by: Chokwe Lumumba
- Succeeded by: Tony Yarber

Member of the Jackson City Council
- In office July 1, 2005 – July 1, 2021
- Preceded by: Betty Dagner-Cook
- Succeeded by: Vernon Hartley

Personal details
- Born: 1932 or 1933 (age 93–94)
- Party: Democratic
- Education: B.A. Alcorn State University; M.A. University of Southern California

Charles Tillman (born 1932/1933) is an American politician who served on the Jackson, Mississippi City council for twelve years and as acting mayor after the death of Chokwe Lumumba, becoming the 5th consecutive African-American mayor of the city.

== Biography ==
Tillman graduated with a B.A. in business education from Alcorn State University in 1958 and a M.A. in guidance and counseling from the University of Southern California in 1962. He did additional coursework at Atlanta University and took post-graduate classes at the University of Notre Dame and at Jackson State University. He began his career as a counselor at Rowan and Brinkley middle schools in Jackson before becoming a school principal and later president of the Jackson Public Schools Board. He was an active volunteer which led to his running for the Jackson City Council in 2005. In May 2005, he narrowly defeated Betty Dagner-Cook, 903 votes to Dagner-Cook's 845 votes in the Democratic primary for Ward 5 councilmember. On June 7, 2005, he defeated Independent candidate Joe Louis Sanders in the general election, 2,586 votes to Sanders' 384 votes.

After the death of mayor Chokwe Lumumba, Tillman was sworn in as acting mayor on February 25, 2014. He served as mayor until April 24, 2014, when Tony Yarber was sworn in after a special election.

In the 2021 election, seeking a 4th term on the City Council, he was defeated by Vernon Hartley, 936 votes to Tillman's 482.

== Awards ==
In 1982, Tillman received the Governor's Distinguished Service Award for Outstanding Voluntary Community Service and the National Council of Negro Women's Appreciation Award for Outstanding and Dedicated Service.

== Personal life ==
He has two children.
