= Frank Melton =

American mayor and broadcaster

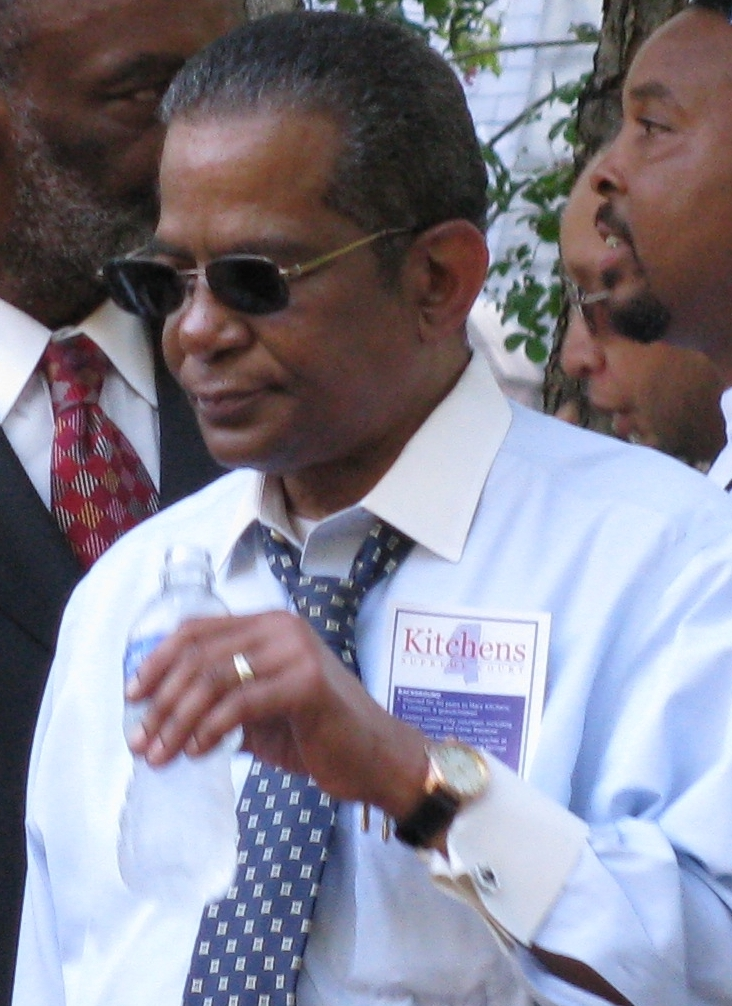
- Melton at a Democratic political rally in Jackson

Mayor of Jackson, Mississippi
- In office July 4, 2005 – May 7, 2009
- Preceded by: Harvey Johnson Jr.
- Succeeded by: Leslie B. McLemore (interim)

Personal details
- Born: March 19, 1949 Houston, Texas, U.S.
- Died: May 7, 2009 (aged 60) Jackson, Mississippi, U.S.
- Party: Democratic
- Spouse: Ellen Melton
- Education: Stephen F. Austin State University (BA)

Frank Ervin Melton (March 19, 1949 – May 7, 2009) was the mayor of Jackson, Mississippi, United States, from 4 July 2005 until his death on 7 May 2009. Melton, an African American, defeated the city's first black mayor Harvey Johnson, Jr. Melton won 63 percent of the vote in the Democratic primary against Johnson, who had served two terms. Melton quickly swept into action to rid Jackson of drug-related crime, improve economic development, and improve city infrastructure. Since Melton became mayor, he touted economic-development projects totaling over $1.6 billion, creating at least 4,500 jobs in the city. Others pointed out that many of those projects were in the works when he started in office. He was embroiled in several controversies during his tenure, including questionable power breaches and criminal misdemeanor activity.

== Early life ==
Melton was born in Houston, Texas on March 19, 1949, to his parents Herbert Melton and Marguerite Haynes-Melton, both of whom were active members of the University Presbyterian Church in Houston. Prior to graduation from high school and following in the grid-iron footsteps of one of his earlier Booker T. Washington Eagles quarterback idols, Eldridge Dickey (Tennessee State Univ., Oakland Raiders), Frank was a popular, studious, and disciplined Quarterback for the Eagles. Melton graduated from Booker T. Washington High School. He moved to Nacogdoches, Texas to earn a BA at Stephen F. Austin State University. In college, he took a position with the Texas Department of Mental Health and Mental Retardation, serving as Director of Recreation at its Lufkin State School.

== Early career ==
He entered broadcasting after graduation, first as a sports anchor for KTRE in Lufkin, Texas and then, in 1977, as general manager of KLTV. He climbed the ranks at KLTV before becoming president of parent company Buford Television, Inc. In 1984, he became chairman and CEO of WLBT in Jackson, Mississippi, in which position he remained until 2002.

Melton served as the head of the Mississippi Bureau of Narcotics for 14 months, appointed by former Mississippi governor Ronnie Musgrove in December 2002. Governor Haley Barbour, who defeated Musgrove in the 2003 gubernatorial election, dismissed Melton and other holdover political appointees when he took office. Melton also served in numerous other fields, including serving as the director of the Governor's Criminal Justice Task Force, after being appointed by former governor Kirk Fordice.

Melton served on the national board of directors for the Broadcast Music Incorporated (BMI), the Liberty Broadcasting board of directors, and the NBC Affiliates board of directors. He served on the Liberty Broadcasting board of directors; the Wave board of directors, the Community Broadcast Group, and the NBC Affiliates board of directors.

== Community work ==
Melton also worked as a member of the board of directors for United Way and the Jackson Chamber of Commerce. He was an instructor at Jackson State University. He gave numerous speeches in the inner-city high schools and city universities.

== As mayor ==
Melton led drug sweeps and drug raids. The city's narcotics unit was reduced and few drug arrests were made. Many citizens were pleased to see him take this hands-on and vocal approach to addressing the city's problems. Yet many city residents, including the NAACP and the ACLU, have disagreed with the mayor's crime-fighting tactics and what they call illegal and unconstitutional actions. He wore a Jackson Police Department badge and carried a gun.

In April 2006, Melton lambasted Hinds County District Attorney Faye Peterson because she would not put his star witness, Christopher Walker, on the stand to testify against Albert "Batman" Donelson, the alleged leader of the Wood Street Players. The district attorney had to drop Walker from the witness list because the defense provided affidavits showing that Walker had long lived with mayor. Melton had given Walker a copy of his credit card, a car, cash and other assistance. The mayor responded that he was offering Walker "witness protection."

Soon after Donelson was acquitted, Melton held a press conference with Walker, during which he accused the county's first black female district attorney of having an affair with a murdered bail bondsman, an allegation that was not substantiated. Within days of that press conference, federal investigators revoked Walker's probation because he had failed nearly a dozen drug tests during the period leading up to the Donelson trial.

After a series of articles and photographs appeared in spring 2006 showing that Melton was carrying concealed firearms without a permit, and amid increasing editorials calling for authorities to curtail Melton's actions, Mississippi Attorney General Jim Hood investigated Melton's actions. On June 1 Hood sent Melton a letter warning of prosecution if he continued to carry weapons into places where they were prohibited, further warning him he was not a police officer. Melton told the Jackson Free Press that he did not have to heed Hood's warning, and continued to carry weapons wherever he wanted. In late July 2006, the head of the ACLU racial profiling division arrived in Jackson to address reports of racial profiling related to Melton's raids and techniques.

In September 2006, Mayor Melton, with his detective bodyguards and a group of youths, called the "lawn crew" because they traveled with Melton, ostensibly to help with neighborhood clean-up, raided half a duplex on Ridgeway Street without a warrant. Witnesses say that Melton attacked much of the rental duplex with a large stick. He cut his hand during the incident and had to go to the hospital for stitches. He reportedly returned with the young men, with sledgehammers to finish destroying that side of the duplex. Police arrested the tenant, Evans Welch, on drug possession, but he was discharged within days for lack of evidence. No warrant was issued for the raid, nor was the owner of the duplex—Jennifer Sutton—notified of any intention to conduct the raid or damage her property. After news of the demolition broke on Sept. 1, both the attorney general and the district attorney investigated the incident.

Melton and bodyguards Michael Recio and Marcus Wright were indicted on September 15, 2006, on multiple felony charges in the Ridgeway Street demolition, including burglary, conspiracy and the inducement of a minor to commit a felony. Melton was also indicted on three gun charges—a felony for carrying his weapon onto a college campus, two misdemeanors for the church and public park—the same day. Later in the year, Melton took a guilty plea on the gun misdemeanors and pleaded no-contest on the felony. The terms of both his bond and his probation for the gun charges did not allow him to be around firearms, supervise children under 17, leave his home past midnight without 48 hours' prior permission from his probation officer, consume drugs or alcohol, or use police equipment in any way. Melton, Michael Recio and Marcus Wright were acquitted on all counts filed in the Ridgeway Street incident on April 26, 2007. The prosecution dropped the inducement of a minor charge during the trial.

Some civil-rights leaders defended Melton, including Charles Evers, older brother of slain civil rights leader Medgar Evers, and Stephanie Parker-Weaver, daughter of the first openly known interracial couple in Jackson. Parker-Weaver helped lead a campaign to convince Jacksonians of Melton's innocence, including a rally at City Hall with signs stating "Vote Melton Not Guilty." He also drew support from many white conservatives in Jackson who appreciated his crime-fighting methods. Prominent businessman Leland Speed, and families of similar conservatives, provided much of Melton's financial support. Melton told some conservatives that he would take the city past race politics, and explained why he ran as a Democrat. "Most of you are Republican," he said. "The reality is, if you're an African American in Jackson, you have to run as a Democrat to win." He added: "I don't like either party." He later on stated he viewed Joseph Stalin, John F. Kennedy, and Mao Zedong as his political influences, which caused him more controversy and cost him support from conservatives.

Other African American leaders, including the president of the state NAACP, Derrick Johnson, and the director of the ACLU of Mississippi, Nsombi Lambright, called for justice for the victims of Melton's unorthodox and illegal crime-fighting strategies. They said he was profiling poor blacks in the city. Those groups are leading an effort to start a civilian review board, in part in response to Melton's methods.

Melton was a member of the Mayors Against Illegal Guns Coalition, an organization formed in 2006 and co-chaired by New York City mayor Michael Bloomberg and Boston mayor Thomas Menino.

On November 16, 2007, Mayor Melton appointed Hinds County Sheriff Malcolm McMillin as Jackson's new police chief, after reassigning the police chief Shirlene Anderson to a new post within his administration. Sheriff McMillin decided to keep his post as Hinds County Sheriff in addition to acting as the chief of the Jackson Police Department, becoming the first person in Mississippi's history to serve as both County Sheriff and City Police Chief. After reviewing the applicable state laws and ethics rules, counsel determined the Sheriff could head both agencies legally and be compensated from both. He was confirmed by the Jackson City Council on a 4-2 vote. In securing McMillin as Police Chief, Mayor Melton promised not to interfere in the operations of the police department and to remain focused on other mayoral duties.

== Controversies and criminal proceedings ==
July 19, 2006 – Jackson Mayor Frank Melton received criticism from advocates for the homeless when he used the city's emergency order to enforce a 10 p.m. curfew for the city's homeless population. According to Michael Stoops, executive director of the National Coalition for the Homeless in Washington, the curfew is the first of its kind in the nation. He also said that it effectively amounts to a modern Jim Crow law.

July 26, 2006 – Frank Melton raises security concerns with US House of Representative, and senior Homeland Security Committee Democrat, Bennie Thompson (MS) when Melton applied for, and was issued, a United States Capitol Police badge and identification card. The card allowed Melton, armed, to bypass security in Federal Buildings, congressional offices and Congress. Wilson Livingood, sergeant-at-arms for the U. S. House, stated in the report to Thompson dated Aug. 17 that Melton showed a Jackson Police Department credential to Capitol police.

August 26, 2006 – See above for Ridgeway incident.

Nov. 15, 2006 – Melton pleaded guilty to two misdemeanors for carrying a weapon into a church and a park, and no contest to a reduced charge on what had been a felony count involving a gun onto the grounds of the Mississippi College School of Law.

March 1, 2007 – Judge Tomie Green issued a warrant for the arrest of Frank Melton. The warrant was issued on the basis of probation violation because Melton resumed going on midnight club raids, while wearing an unofficial badge, among other possible violations.

March 7, 2007 – Frank Melton left the hospital in the early morning and returned home without alerting the Sheriff's Department. After his ankle bracelet alerted his probation officer that he was back at home, the sheriff called and told Melton to turn himself in to Hinds County authorities. Hours later, the sheriff instructed then Jackson Police Sergeant Eric B. Fox, to escort Melton to the jail. Melton ignored the earlier instructions from the sheriff.

March 8, 2007 – The Mississippi Supreme Court vacated the arrest warrant for Frank Melton, and asked that Hinds County Circuit Judge Tomie Green be recused without explaining the reasons for either decision.

April 24, 2007 – Frank Melton goes on trial for felony charges stemming from the September 15, 2006 demolition of a house on Ridgeway Street.

April 26, 2007 – Frank Melton is found not guilty on all counts.

February 2, 2009 – Melton's federal civil rights trial for demolishing the Ridgeway house began.

February 24, 2009 – Melton's federal civil rights trial ended in a mistrial when jurors notified the judge that they could not arrive at a verdict. The case was scheduled to be retried on May 11.

== Mayoral re-election bid ==
Melton filed to run for re-election for the 2009 election. However, on March 17, 2009, the Jackson Democratic Municipal Executive Committee disqualified Melton in a unanimous vote because Melton did not meet the city's residency requirements. He did not file homestead exemption on his home in Jackson but on his home in Tyler, Texas, where his wife Ellen lives. The unanimous vote took Melton's name off the ballot for the May 5, 2009 primary.

Melton filed a lawsuit against the Jackson Democratic Municipal Executive Committee to have his name returned to the ballot. On March 26, 2009, Jones County Circuit Court Judge Billy Joe Landrum ordered Melton restored as a Democratic mayoral candidate. Landrum said Melton "overwhelmingly rebutted" the charge by showing documents with his Jackson home address, including his Mississippi driver's license, utility bills and voting records.

On May 5, 2009, Melton lost his bid for re-election, coming in third in the vote totals.

== Death ==
On election night, Melton was rushed to the hospital. Melton's security detail driver, Sgt. Eric B. Fox, assigned by the Jackson Police Department found him unresponsive. He had suffered a cardiac arrest at his Jackson home. He died shortly after midnight on Thursday, May 7, 2009, less than two days after losing the election. His wife, Dr. Ellen Melton, was at his side. He died at St. Dominic Jackson Memorial Hospital in Jackson, MS.

Political offices
Preceded by Harvey Johnson, Jr.	Mayor of Jackson, MS; 2005–2009	Succeeded by Leslie B. McLemore Interim
