= Leslie B. McLemore =

American mayor

Leslie-Burl McLemore
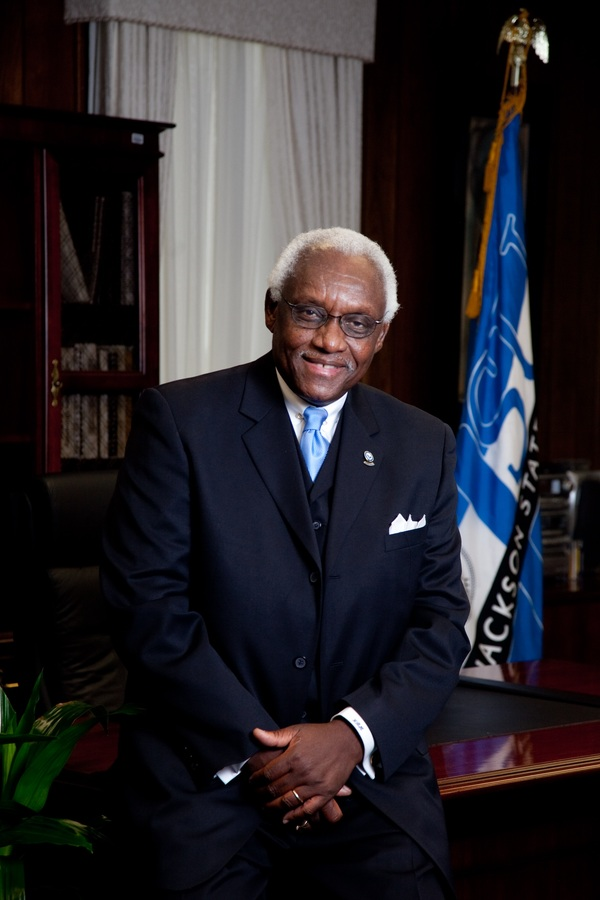

Mayor of Jackson, Mississippi (Interim)
- In office May 7, 2009 – July 6, 2009
- Preceded by: Frank Melton
- Succeeded by: Harvey Johnson Jr.

Personal details
- Born: August 17, 1940 (age 86) Walls, Mississippi, U.S.
- Party: Democratic
- Spouse: Betty Mallett
- Education: Rust College (BA); Atlanta University (MA); University of Massachusetts Amherst (PhD)
- Profession: Activist, Professor, Councilman

Leslie-Burl McLemore (born August 17, 1940) is an American civil rights activist and political leader from Walls, Mississippi. He served as interim mayor of Jackson following the death of Frank Melton on May 7, 2009 until the inauguration of re-elected mayor Harvey Johnson, Jr. on July 3, 2009.

== Early life ==
Leslie-Burl McLemore was born in Walls, Mississippi on August 17, 1940, the son of a sharecropper. He was raised by his mother and his maternal grandfather, Leslie Williams, who sparked his interest in politics and service. He attended Delta Center High School, where he first became involved in political action by participating in a boycott during his senior year because the school did not have any black history books in the library.

In September 1960, McLemore began studies at Rust College for social science and economics on full scholarship. It was there that he first became seriously involved in the Civil Rights Movement. As freshman class president, McLemore participated in a boycott of a theatre in Holly Springs because they would not allow black people to sit on the main level of the theater.

While at Rust College, McLemore would continue to be involved in student protests. He became involved with the Student Nonviolent Coordinating Committee (SNCC) to coordinate activities such as voter registration drives. He was also the founding chapter president of the National Association for the Advancement of Colored People (NAACP) at Rust. McLemore served as northern regional coordinator for the 1963 Freedom Ballot campaign.

In 1964, during the famous Freedom Summer, McLemore was involved in the formation of the Mississippi Freedom Democratic Party (MFDP), of which he was vice chair. He was a founding member of the MFDP Executive Committee and an MFDP delegate to the 1964 Democratic National Convention. Through his efforts, McLemore was able to meet and work with other activists such as Ella Baker, Frank Smith, Elenore Homes Norton, and Charles Sherrod as coordinator and lobbyist of the National Office of the MFDP in Washington DC. Later, he would focus his political science research on the MFDP, the first to formally research the impact of a local political movement.

== Academic career ==
McLemore graduated from Rust College in 1964 with a bachelor's degree. He pursued graduate studies at Atlanta University, where he obtained a master's degree in political science. Later, McLemore received a doctorate in government from the University of Massachusetts Amherst. At the University of Massachusetts, Amherst, McLemore helped to found the W.E.B. DuBois Department of African American Studies. He also took up post-doctoral fellowships at The Johns Hopkins University and at Harvard University. After this, he took on a position teaching at Jackson State University as the founding Chair of the Department of Political Science, and later Dean of the Graduate School and Founding Director of the Office of Research. He would eventually become interim president of Jackson State University in 2010. He has published in the areas of black politics, southern politics, environmental politics, and the Civil Rights Movement. He is the co-author of Freedom Summer: A Brief History with Documents with John Dittmer and Jeff Kolnick, and co-author of The Fannie Lou Hamer National Institute on Citizenship and Democracy: Engaging a Curriculum and Pedagogy with Michelle Deardorff, Jefferey Kolnick, and Thandekile R.M. Mvusi.

In 1997, McLemore become the founding Director of the Fannie Lou Hamer National Institute on Citizenship and Democracy at Jackson State University. Over the course of more than twenty years, the Hamer Institute conducted numerous summer institutes for K-12 students, K-12 teachers, and community members and University faculty.

== Political involvement ==
McLemore was elected to serve on the Jackson City Council in 1999, representing the second ward for 10 years, of which 5 were spent as council president. Upon the death of Mayor Frank Melton, McLemore also served as acting mayor. McLemore did not seek re-election to his council seat. His term ended in July 2009, at which time he retired to dedicate his efforts full-time to the Hamer Institute.

While teaching at Jackson State University, McLemore returned to Walls where he served as a member of the Walls Board of Aldermen. Upon election in 2017, he made history again by serving as one of the two first black elected officials in Walls, Mississippi, the other being Curtis Farmer. In 2023, McLemore's efforts were honored when the Mississippi Historical Society awarded him its 2023 Lifetime Achievement Award for his accomplishments with the MFDP.

== Family ==
McLemore is married to his wife, Attorney Betty Mallett. He has one son, Leslie McLemore II, who is a practicing attorney and writer in Washington DC and is married to Jacinta W. McLemore. He has two grandchildren: Harper and Harlow.

Political offices
Preceded by Frank Melton	Mayor of Jackson, MS; May 7, 2009–July 6, 2009	Succeeded by Harvey Johnson, Jr.
