= Cy Rosenblatt =

American politician (born 1954)

Member of the Mississippi State Senate from the 26th district
- In office January 1984 – January 1992
- Preceded by: Ed Ellington
- Succeeded by: John Horhn

Personal details
- Born: April 5, 1954 (age 72) Jackson, Mississippi, U.S.
- Party: Republican
- Other political affiliations: Democratic (until 1988)
- Children: 3
- Education: Southern Methodist University (B.A.); University of Virginia (M.P.A.)

Cy Hart Rosenblatt (born April 5, 1954) is an American politician and businessman. He served in the Mississippi State Senate, representing the 26th District (Hinds County), from 1984 to 1992.

== Early life ==
Cy Hart Rosenblatt was born on April 5, 1954, in Jackson, Mississippi. He was one of two children of cardiologist Dr. William H. Rosenblatt (1914-1991) and Margaret Dreyfuss Rosenblatt (1914-1986). Cy first gained an interest in politics at the age of 10 or 11 when he saw bumper stickers for election candidates passing by his house. He graduated from Murrah High School in 1972 with a 4.0 grade point average. He then attended Southern Methodist University, graduating in 1976 with a Bachelor of Arts in political science. He was also a member of the Phi Beta Kappa society there and the student body president in his senior year. He then attended the University of Virginia, where he received a Master of Public Administration degree.

== Career ==
In 1979, he was appointed director of the Mississippi State Board of Health's Office of Planning and Evaluation. Rosenblatt was an administrative assistant for health policy under Governor William Winter (1980-1984). In April 1983, he announced his candidacy for the Mississippi State Senate, to represent its 26th District as a Democrat for the 1984-1988 term. He conducted a door-to-door campaign. He won the primary, defeating Jo Hollman with 8,026 votes (or 60%) compared to Hollman's 5,365 votes (or 40%). He listed finances and moral issues as his main campaign topics. He faced Republican lawyer William Marble in the general election and won, receiving 11,497 votes (or 67%) compared to Marble's 5,727 votes (or 33%). He was appointed Vice Chairman of the Senate's Public Health Committee. In 1986, he wrote a newspaper column supporting increasing responsibility of counties in government in order to save money for the state budget.

In 1987, Rosenblatt was re-elected to represent the 26th District for the 1988-1992 term. During this term, he vice chaired the Education Committee, and also served on the following committees: Appropriations; Environmental Protection, Conservation and Water Resources; Executive Contingent Fund; Public Health and Welfare; and Universities and Colleges. In November 1988, Rosenblatt announced his switch to the Republican Party. In 1990, Rosenblatt suggested closing Mississippi Valley State University and Mississippi University for Women in order to fund statewide educational reforms. In January 1990, after voting against a lottery-legalizing bill, Rosenblatt announced he was not running for re-election, in order to focus on his family and career.

After leaving the Senate, Rosenblatt served as President of MetroHealth America, Inc. In 1996, he served as Executive Director of a non-profit organization called Health Futures. From 1997 to 2004, he was part of a federal committee tracking hospital data. He was part of a Study Group to Review Mississippi's Election Laws under Secretary of State Delbert Hosemann (2008-2020). He also served as a faculty member of the University of Mississippi Department of Political Science.

== Personal life ==
Rosenblatt, initially a Methodist but in the late 1980s a Presbyterian, is married to the former Judy Clinton. They have three children together.
