= 2017 Jackson mayoral election =

- June 6, 2017
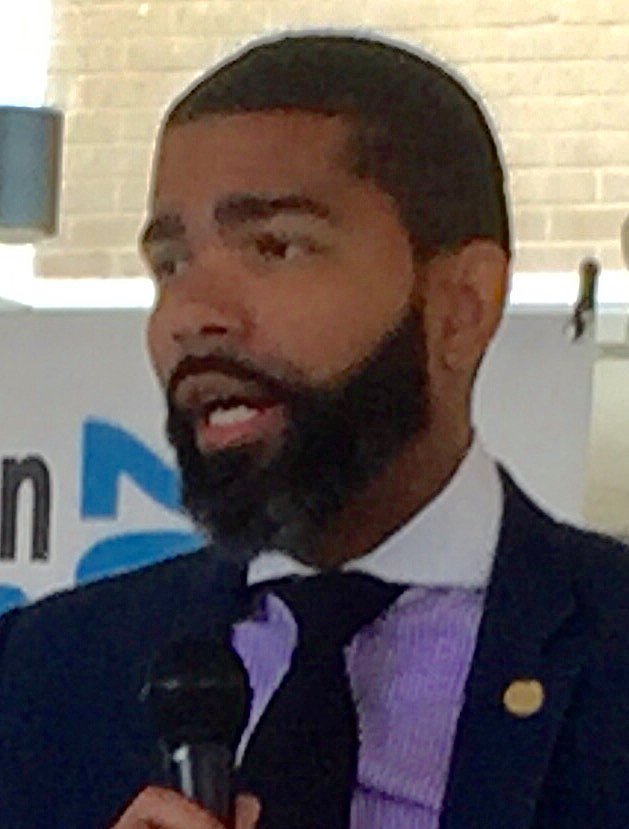
Candidate	Chokwe Antar Lumumba
Party	Democratic
Popular vote	23,175
Percentage	92.56%

The 2017 mayoral election in Jackson, Mississippi took place on June 6, 2017, alongside other Jackson municipal races. Chokwe Antar Lumumba, son of late former mayor Chokwe Lumumba, was elected mayor in a landslide in the general election after defeating eight other candidates, including incumbent mayor Tony Yarber, in the primary.

== Results ==
Democratic primary, May 2, 2017
Party	Candidate	Votes	%
Democratic	Chokwe Antar Lumumba	18,803	55.14
Democratic	John Horhn	7,210	21.14
Democratic	Robert Graham	5,161	15.13
Democratic	Tony Yarber (incumbent)	1,843	5.40
Democratic	Ronnie Crudup Jr.	801	2.35
Democratic	Monroe Jackson	92	0.27
Democratic	Stanley Gladney	91	0.27
Democratic	Jessie Jones	53	0.16
Democratic	Brian Reynolds	34	0.10
Total votes		34,088	100.00

General election, June 6, 2017
Party	Candidate	Votes	%
Democratic	Chokwe Antar Lumumba	23,175	92.56
Republican	Jason D. Wells	900	3.59
Independent	Jaclyn Mask	572	2.28
Independent	Kenneth A. Swarts	175	0.70
Independent	Gwendolyn Ward Osborne Chapman	151	0.60
Libertarian	Corinthian Sanders	43	0.17
Total votes		25,016	100.00
