= John Horhn =

American politician (born 1955)

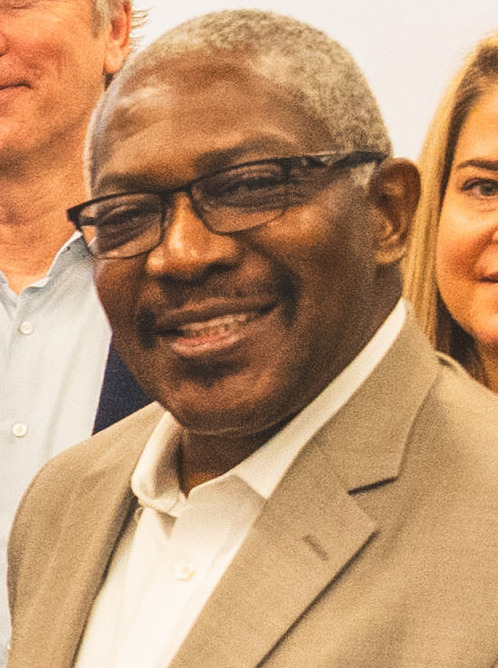

54th Mayor of Jackson
- Incumbent
- Assumed office July 1, 2025
- Preceded by: Chokwe Antar Lumumba

Member of the Mississippi Senate from the 26th district
- In office January 5, 1993 – July 1, 2025
- Preceded by: Cy Rosenblatt
- Succeeded by: Kamesha Mumford

Personal details
- Born: February 8, 1955 (age 71) Goodman, Mississippi, U.S.
- Party: Democratic
- Education: Centre College (BA)

John A. Horhn (born February 8, 1955) is an American politician who is mayor of Jackson, Mississippi. He had served in the Mississippi State Senate from the 26th district from 1993 to 2025. A Democrat, he previously served as state tourism director from 1989 to 1992.

He was the Democratic nominee in the 2025 Jackson mayoral election, which he would go on to win after securing over 67% of the vote.

== Early life and education ==
Horhn was born on February 8, 1955, in Goodman, Mississippi. His father Charlie was a labor organizer with the International Brotherhood of Electrical Workers, and his mother Willistene was a public school cafeteria worker. His family moved to Jackson when he was three weeks old. He first grew up in Midtown before moving to Georgetown; he later moved to Virden, where he spent much of his formative years. He attended Morrison Elementary School, serving as president of his class. He graduated from the Jackson Public School system.

He received a bachelor of arts in English and dramatic arts from Centre College in 1977 and later served as a trustee for the college. He studied at Jackson State University and Duke University through their leadership programs.

== Career ==
Horhn worked as a job developer for the A. Philip Randolph Institute from 1978 to 1980. He then worked as the executive director for the Mississippi Cultural Arts Coalition from 1980 to 1981. Afterward, he joined the Mississippi Arts Commission as a program manager from 1981 to 1985. He became the state film commissioner in 1985 and served in that position until 1988. Starting in 1988, he worked under Governor Ray Mabus as the federal state programs director. In 1989, he became Mississippi's tourism director, holding that position until 1992.

He organized the Mississippi Blues Commission in 1991 to map important blues sites in Mississippi, and later co-sponsored legislation in 2004 to make it official in state law. Since 2011, Horhn has served as vice chairman of the Mississippi Blues Foundation, an organization created by the commission.

=== State senator ===
A Democrat, Horhn has served as a state senator since 1993, representing parts of Hinds and Madison counties. In the Mississippi State Senate, he served as chair of the Economic Development Committee.

== Mayor of Jackson, Mississippi ==
=== Campaigns ===
==== 2009 ====
In January 2009, Horhn announced his candidacy for the 2009 Jackson mayoral election and focused his campaign on economic development, infrastructure, crime, and other issues. He lost in the Democratic primary, garnering around 6,000 votes.

==== 2014 ====
On March 12, 2014, Horhn announced his candidacy for the 2014 Jackson mayoral election. He touted his experience as a state senator and sought the mayorship to improve city services. He lost in the Democratic primary.

==== 2017 ====
In January 2017, Horhn announced his candidacy for the 2017 Jackson mayoral election. On the campaign, he focused on his accomplishments in the state senate and the relationships he built. His campaign was considered more successful compared to his 2009 and 2014 runs. However, he faced allegations of being the "white mayoral candidate" because of his support in wards 1 and 7. While he received more votes than his prior campaigns and came second among all candidates, he lost in the Democratic primary to Chokwe Antar Lumumba.

==== 2025 ====
In October 2024, Horhn announced his candidacy for the 2025 Jackson mayoral election, with priorities focused on addressing abandoned properties, increasing economic development, and staking out a plan for Jackson's future.

In the first round of the Democratic primary on April 1, 2025, Horhn secured 48.4% of the vote. He progressed to the Democratic runoff against Chokwe Antar Lumumba and won in a landslide victory, with around 74% of the vote. In the June 3, 2025, general election, Horhn faced off against several other candidates and was elected with over 67% of the vote.

=== Tenure ===
On July 1, 2025, Hohrn was sworn in office, in a ceremony led by Jackson, Mississippi area-based U.S. Congressman Bennie Thompson. Various other Mississippi public officials, including former Jackson mayors J. Kane Ditto and Harvey Johnson, Mississippi Lieutenant Governor Delbert Hosemann, Mississippi Governor Tate Reeves and former Mississippi Supreme Court justice Rueben Anderson, spoke at the ceremony.

== Personal life ==
Horhn is married and has two children. He is a member of the Phi Beta Sigma fraternity.

In 2013, he was the victim of an armed robbery at his home in Jackson. That same year, he was arrested for driving under the influence; he pleaded no contest and was fined.

Political offices
Preceded by Chokwe Antar Lumumba	Mayor of Jackson; 2025–present	Incumbent
