= George Flaggs Jr. =

American politician (born 1953)

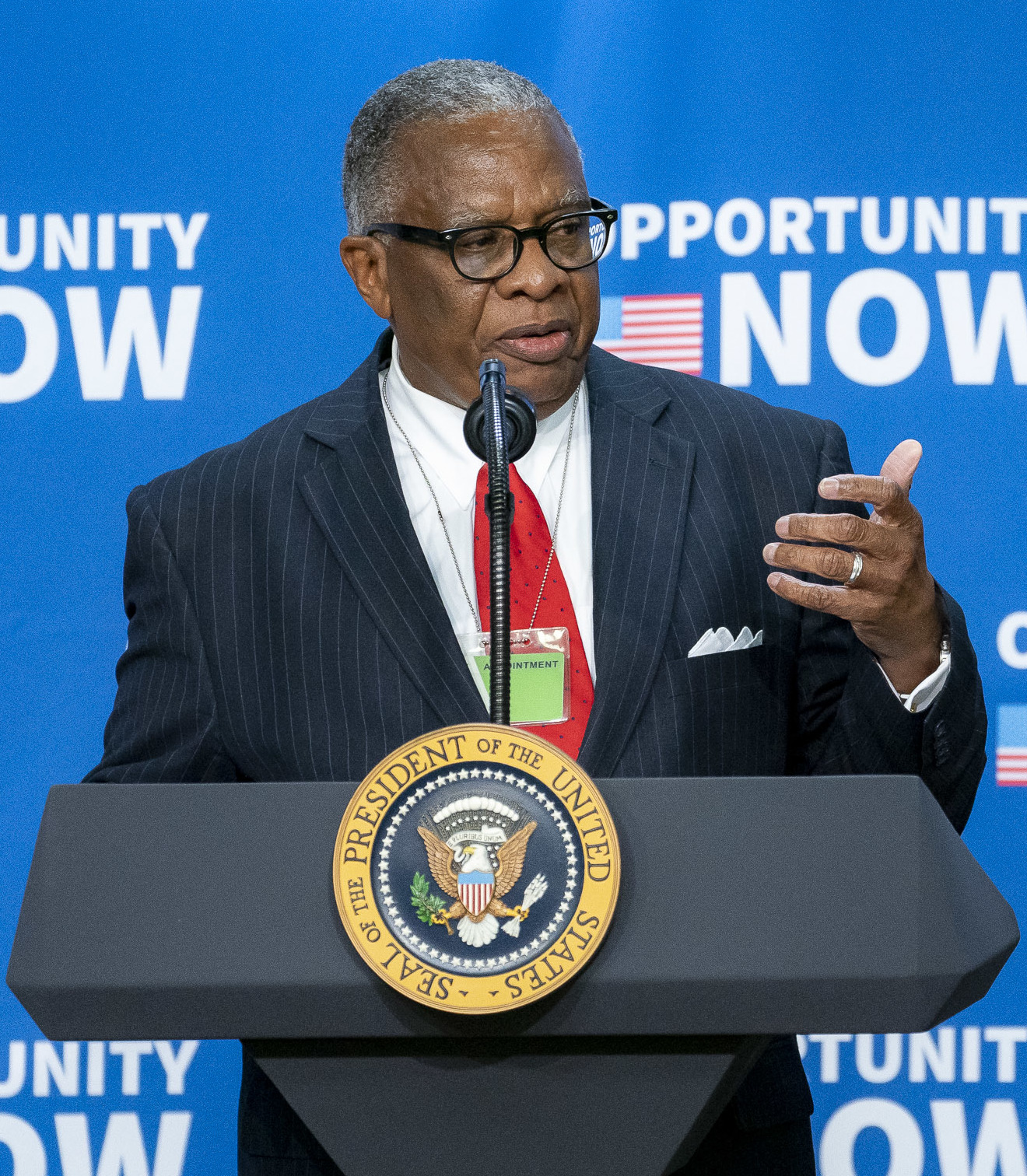

Mayor of Vicksburg, Mississippi
- In office 2013 – June 3, 2025
- Preceded by: Paul Winfield
- Succeeded by: Willis Thompson

Member of the Mississippi House of Representatives from the 55th district
- In office 1988 – July 1, 2013
- Preceded by: Buddie Newman
- Succeeded by: Oscar Denton

Personal details
- Born: March 20, 1953 (age 73) Edwards, Mississippi, U.S.
- Party: Independent (2018–present)
- Other political affiliations: Democratic (before 2018)
- Spouse(s): Linda Flaggs (Divorced); Valencia Jones (since 2014)
- Children: 2
- Education: Hinds Junior College (A.A.); Jackson State University (B.S.)

George Flaggs Jr. (born March 20, 1953) is an American politician who served as Mayor of Vicksburg, Mississippi from 2013 to 2025. An independent, Flaggs won his first term as mayor in 2013 and was reelected in 2017 and again in 2021, before losing another re-election bid in 2025. Prior to becoming mayor, Flaggs was a member of the Mississippi House of Representatives from the 55th district from 1988 to 2013. He is a member of the Democratic Party. He was a youth court counselor in Warren County and a member of the Vicksburg Planning Commission and the Zoning Board of Appeals.

In 2014, Flaggs married Valencia Jones, an employee of the U.S. Army Corps of Engineers Engineer Research and Development Center, in a small ceremony at Triumph Church. He has two children from a prior marriage. In March 2018, Flaggs left the Democratic Party and became an independent.

On June 3, 2025, Flaggs lost re-election to former alderman and Democratic nominee Willis Thompson.
