= Tony Yarber =

American politician

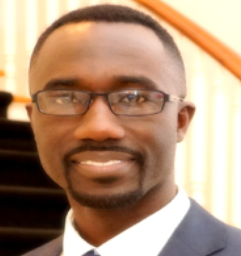

52nd Mayor of Jackson
- In office April 24, 2014 – July 3, 2017
- Preceded by: Charles Tillman (Interim Mayor)
- Succeeded by: Chokwe Antar Lumumba

Personal details
- Born: March 17, 1978 (age 48) Jackson, Mississippi, U.S.
- Party: Democratic
- Education: University of Southern Mississippi (BS); Jackson State University (MS)
- Occupation: Pastor; Elementary school principal

Tony Yarber (born April 16, 1978) is an American pastor, educator and politician in Jackson, Mississippi. He was elected as Mayor of Jackson in April 2014 from special election following the death in office of Chokwe Lumumba. A native of Jackson and experienced city councilor, Yarber is noted for his passion for youth causes, and has been described as "a consensus builder". He was succeeded as Mayor of Jackson by his predecessor's son Chokwe Antar Lumumba on July 3, 2017.

== Career and personal life ==
Yarber was born in Jackson, Mississippi to George and Deloris Yarber in 1978, and grew up in the city's Westside Community. He attended Forest Hill High School in Jackson.

Yarber received a B.S. in Elementary Education from the University of Southern Mississippi and an M.S. in Education Administration and Supervision from Jackson State University. He has taught school and served as an elementary school principal. Yarber served as a committee member for the Southern Association of Colleges and Schools.

He is also Pastor and Founder of the non-denominational Relevant Empowerment Church, started in 2008. He has served on the Board of Directors for Relevant Ministries.

Yarber has a black belt in ninjutsu. He is married and has three children.

== Civic groups ==
Yarber is a founding member of Alignment Jackson, a non-profit organization for improving student achievement.

He was the second Vice-President of the Mississippi Black Caucus of Locally Elected Officials.

== Elected office ==
=== City Councillor ===
In 2009, Yarber entered city politics, running for the Jackson City Council from Ward 6. He became City Council Vice President in 2011, and President in 2012. In 2013, Yarber served as Chair of the Budget Committee and the Education/Youth Ad Hoc Committee.

=== Mayor ===
Yarber was elected Mayor of Jackson on April 22, 2014, in a runoff election against Chokwe Antar Lumumba, son of deceased former mayor Chokwe Lumumba.

Yarber stated that his goals as mayor would be to improve customer service for residents and to attract new business. Yarber also discussed Jackson's potential for growth as an entertainment hub, and as a "medical corridor."

On May 2, 2017, Yarber was soundly defeated by Chokwe Antar Lumumba in the nine-candidate primary for the Democratic nominee for mayor of Jackson, receiving 5% to Lumumba's 55%.
