= Mary Hawkins Butler =

American mayor

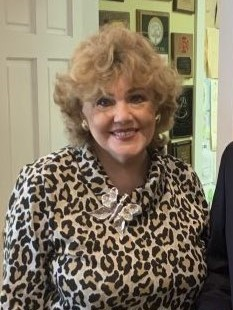

Mayor of Madison, Mississippi
- Incumbent
- Assumed office 1981

Personal details
- Born: December 12, 1953 (age 72) Mississippi
- Party: Republican
- Education: Belhaven University (BBA)

Mary Hawkins Butler (born December 12, 1953) is an American politician who has served as mayor of Madison, Mississippi, since 1981 as a member of the Republican Party. She is one of the longest-serving mayors in the United States.

== Career ==
She earned a Bachelor of Business Administration degree from Belhaven University in Jackson, Mississippi. Butler was an alderman prior to her election as mayor of Madison in 1981.

Butler ran unsuccessfully for state auditor in the 2015 elections against incumbent Stacey E. Pickering of Laurel in the Republican primary.

In 2021, Butler filed a lawsuit to overturn a voter-approved medical marijuana ballot initiative. She claimed there is a flaw in the state initiative process therefore medical marijuana initiative is invalid. Supreme Court of Mississippi agreed with Butler and overturned the medical marijuana initiative.

== Controversies ==
On April 23, 2015, Hawkins Butler gave her annual "State of the City Address," in which she compared Madison County engineer Rudy Warnock to a corrupt state official, Chris Epps. As a result, Warnock threatened a lawsuit against Hawkins Butler. She has publicly stated that she believes the entire Madison County Board of Supervisors is corrupt, even saying that all of its members need to be replaced.

In 2020, Initiative 65 was approved in Mississippi, allowing doctors to prescribe medical marijuana. The initiative was approved by 74% of voters with majority support in all 82 counties. Mayor Butler filed a lawsuit in the Mississippi Supreme Court asking the court to invalidate the measure. On May 14, 2021, the Mississippi Supreme Court ruled 6-3 that Initiative 65 was insufficient because it did not comply with the signature distribution requirements in the Mississippi Constitution and held that any subsequent proceeding regarding the initiatives were void. In February 2022, legislation was signed into law, legalizing medical marijuana.
