= List of mayors of Southaven, Mississippi =

The current mayor of Southaven is Darren Musselwhite.

City Hall is located at 8710 Northwest Drive.

== List of mayors ==
Mayor name	Term	Notes
Carlton Aldy	1980–1985	First mayor
Joseph A. Cates	1985–1997	Served three terms
Greg Davis	1997–2013	Served four terms
Darren Musselwhite	2013–	
