= James Young (mayor) =

American politician (born 1955)

James A. Young

Mayor of Philadelphia, Mississippi
- In office July 3, 2009 – June 30, 2025
- Preceded by: Rayburn Waddell
- Succeeded by: Jim Fulton

Personal details
- Born: November 7, 1955 (age 70)
- Party: Democratic
- Spouse: Sheryl Young
- Children: Shanda
- Profession: Clergyman

James A. Young (born November 7, 1955) is an American politician, who served as mayor of Philadelphia, Mississippi from 2009 to 2025 He was first elected in May 2009. His election was especially noted as he is the first African-American mayor of the city, which was previously best known for the murders of Chaney, Goodman, and Schwerner by members of the Ku Klux Klan in 1964.

Young is a Pentecostal preacher and a former county supervisor who was 53 years old at the time of his election. He defeated Rayburn Waddell, a white, three-term incumbent, by 46 votes in the Democratic primary. As there was no Republican challenger, the winner of the primary automatically became the city's next mayor. He took office on July 3, 2009.

Jim Prince, publisher of the local The Neshoba Democrat newspaper, said: "Philadelphia will always be connected to what happened here in 1964, but the fact that Philadelphia, Mississippi, with its notorious past, could elect a black man as mayor, it might be time to quit picking on Philadelphia, Mississippi."

Young's campaign staff credited Barack Obama's presidential campaign for increasing registration of black and young voters in Philadelphia.

On April 1, 2025, Young would be ousted in his latest attempt to get re-elected as mayor of Philadelphia, Mississippi after coming in third place in the Democratic primary, behind Cassie Henson Hickman and Leroy Clemons. Both Hickman and Clemons are African American. Clemons would win the primary runoff, only to then go on to lose to Republican nominee Jim Fulton, a city council member who boasted about his working relationship with Young, in the general election.

== See also ==
- List of first African-American mayors

== Personal life ==
Young and his wife Sheryl have one daughter, Shanda (born 1978).

Young was raised on a farm in Stallo.
