= Harvey Johnson Jr. =

American politician

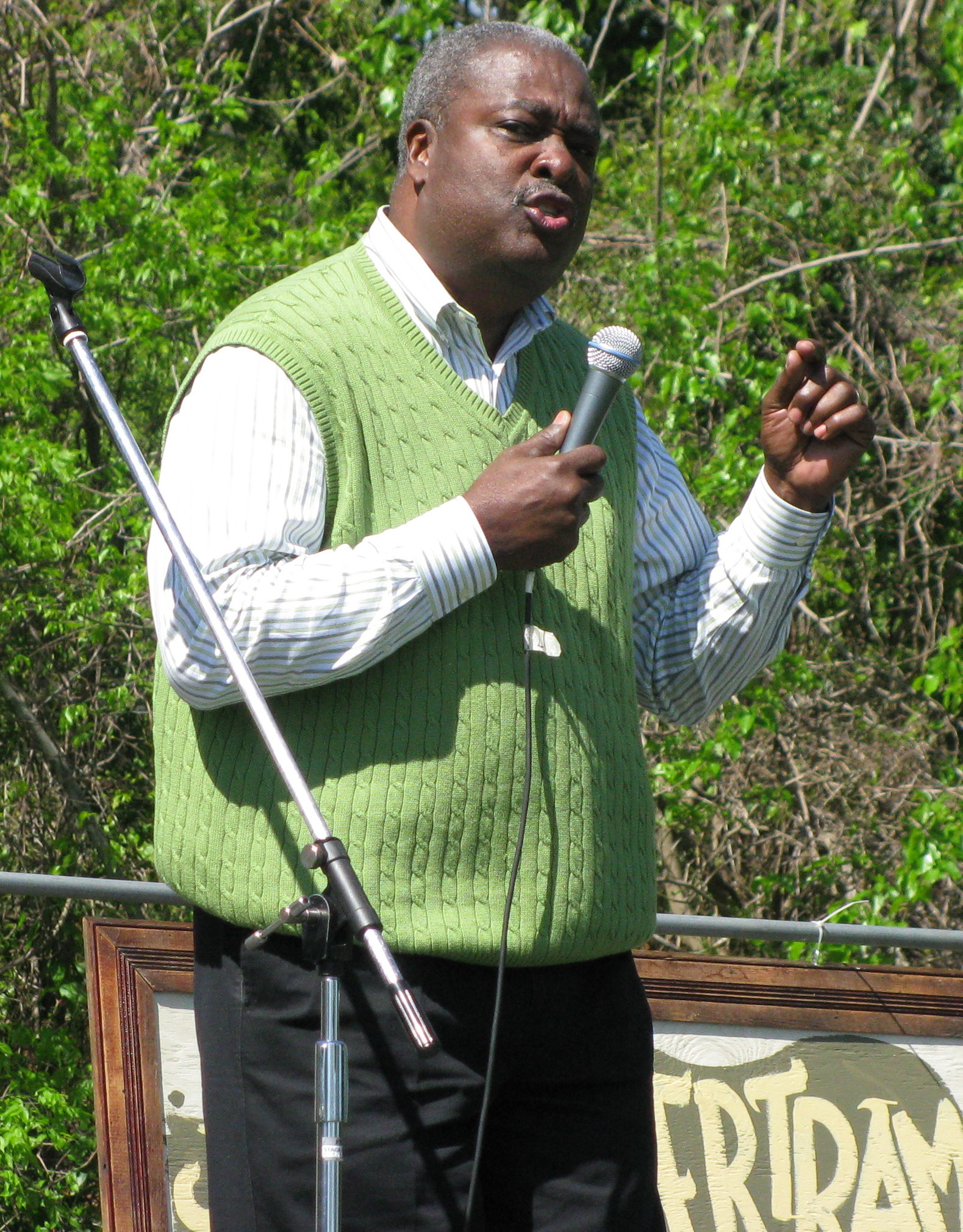
- Speaking at a campaign rally at Belhaven Heights Park in Jackson, 2009

Mayor of Jackson, Mississippi
- In office July 6, 2009 – July 1, 2013
- Preceded by: Leslie B. McLemore (Interim)
- Succeeded by: Chokwe Lumumba
- In office July 7, 1997 – July 4, 2005
- Preceded by: J. Kane Ditto
- Succeeded by: Frank Melton

Personal details
- Born: December 21, 1946 (age 79) Vicksburg, Mississippi, U.S.
- Party: Democratic
- Spouse: Kathy Ezell
- Education: Tennessee State University (BA); University of Cincinnati (MA)
- Website: Mayor's Office

Harvey Johnson Jr. (born December 21, 1946), is an American politician from Mississippi. He was elected in 1997 as the first African American Mayor of Jackson, Mississippi, serving two terms. He was known for his achievements in gaining reinvestment in the city to revitalize downtown.

He ran again in 2009 and was elected. When he ran for what would have been his fourth term, he was defeated in the Democratic primary in July 2013 by challengers Chokwe Lumumba, who was elected as mayor, and Jonathan Lee.

== Biography ==
Harvey Johnson Jr. was born in Vicksburg, Mississippi, and attended the Vicksburg public schools, graduating from Rosa A. Temple High School. He received a bachelor's degree in political science from Tennessee State University and a master's degree in political science from the University of Cincinnati.

His professional career includes the founding of the Mississippi Institute of Small Towns, a non-profit agency developed to assist small economically depressed towns with minority leadership with housing, community development and infrastructure needs. In 1990 Governor Ray Mabus appointed the subject to a six-year term on the state tax commission, which included the oversight of the newly established gaming industry.

In 1993, Johnson ran unsuccessfully for mayor of Jackson, placing third in the Democratic primary behind two white candidates, incumbent mayor J. Kane Ditto and former mayor Dale Danks. But in 1997, Johnson defeated Ditto in the Democratic primary, and later defeated Republican opponent Charlotte Reeves in the general election, becoming Jackson's first African-American mayor.

Supporters credited Johnson with overseeing a dramatic renaissance in the city, leading the charge for several projects to help revive a decaying downtown area, including the revitalization of the Farish Street Neighborhood Historic District and passage of a controversial bond issue to build a convention center. Critics charged that he was an unresponsive leader who was not appropriately concerned with the city's large crime problem, neglected the maintenance of streets, and did little to curb the exodus of Jackson's upper- and middle-class residents to places outside the city limits.

During his reelection bid in 2001, Johnson faced off against Republican challenger, C. Daryl Neely, a city councilman. It was the first time in the city's history that two African-American mayoral candidates faced each other in the general election. Johnson soundly defeated Neely with 61% of the vote.

In 2005, Johnson was challenged in the Democratic primary by Frank Melton, a controversial TV station manager; the challenger promised to solve the city's crime problem in 90 days while giving few specific crime plans, making crime the central focus of the election. Critics charged that Johnson said crime was only a "perception." But he had complained about the "perception of hopelessness" which he said the media's focus on crime engendered. The phrase "perception of crime," while inaccurate, was used widely by opponents and critics of the incumbent mayor. Melton defeated the incumbent by 63 percent of the vote in the Democratic Primary. Melton easily defeated Republican challenger Rick Whitlow in the general election and succeeded Johnson as mayor of Jackson.

Johnson is a member of Alpha Phi Alpha fraternity. He is an alum of National Urban Fellows, class of 1976. Johnson is also a deacon at the Hope Springs Missionary Baptist Church of Jackson, Mississippi.

In early 2009, Johnson again ran for Mayor of Jackson. On Tuesday, May 5, 2009, he led a crowded field of ten candidates in the Democratic primary. Gaining 28% of the vote, Johnson was forced into a runoff with City Councilman Marshand Crisler, who had finished a close second with 27% of the vote. In the runoff two weeks later, Johnson defeated Crisler, winning in five of the seven wards, despite being outspent four to one. In a majority-black city that votes heavily Democratic, Johnson handily defeated Republican challenger George Lambus and four independent candidates in the June 2nd general election. Johnson's election has made him become the city's first three-term mayor since Dale Danks.

Running for re-election in the Democratic primary on May 7, 2013, the veteran mayor was defeated by Chokwe Lumumba, Ward Two Councilman, and Jonathan Lee, former Chamber of Commerce president, in every city ward. Lumumba was elected but died in office in 2014.

== See also ==
- List of first African-American mayors

Political offices
| Preceded by J. Kane Ditto | Mayor of Jackson, MS; 1997–2005 | Succeeded by Frank Melton |
| Preceded by Leslie B. McLemore Interim | Mayor of Jackson, MS; 2009–2013 | Succeeded by Chokwe Lumumba |
