= Chokwe Lumumba =

American lawyer and politician

Chokwe Lumumba Sr.
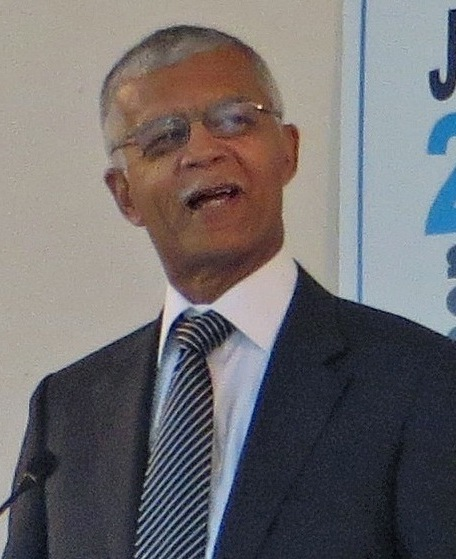
- Lumumba in 2013

Mayor of Jackson, Mississippi
- In office July 1, 2013 – February 25, 2014
- Preceded by: Harvey Johnson Jr.
- Succeeded by: Charles Tillman (Interim Mayor)

Member of Jackson, Mississippi City Council for Ward Two
- In office 2009–2013

Personal details
- Born: Edwin Finley Taliaferro; August 2, 1947 Detroit, Michigan, U.S.
- Died: February 25, 2014 (aged 66) Jackson, Mississippi, U.S.
- Party: Democratic
- Spouse: Nubia Alake Lumumba (died June 18, 2003)
- Children: Kambon Thurman (eldest son), Rukia Lumumba (daughter) and Chokwe Antar Lumumba (younger son)
- Education: Kalamazoo College (BA); Wayne State University (JD)

Chokwe Lumumba Sr. (/ˈʃoʊ.kweɪ ləˈmuːm.bɑː/; born Edwin Finley Taliaferro; August 2, 1947 – February 25, 2014) was an American attorney, activist, and politician, who was affiliated with the Black separatist organization Republic of New Afrika and served as its second vice president. He worked as a human rights lawyer in Michigan and Mississippi. In 2013, after serving on the City Council, he was elected as Mayor of Jackson, Mississippi. His son Chokwe Antar Lumumba was elected Mayor of Jackson in 2017.

== Early life and education ==
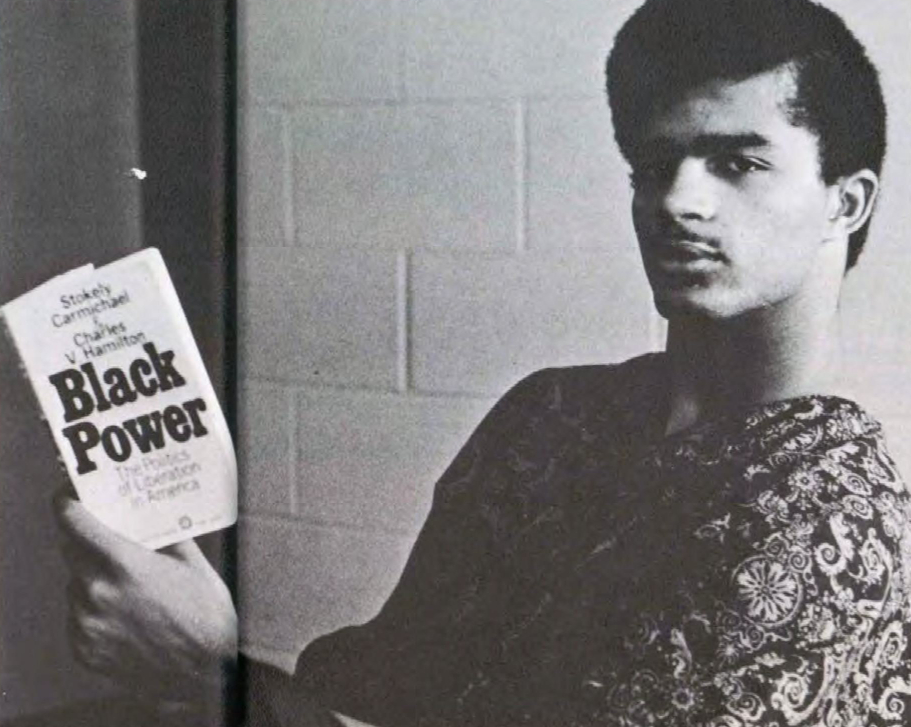
Lumumba, then known as Ed Taliaferro, in the Kalamazoo College yearbook, 1969

He was born in Detroit, Michigan, the second of eight children of Lucien Taliaferro, from Kansas, and Priscilla, from Alabama. Lumumba stated at the 2011 Netroots Nation Annual Conference that his great-grandmother was a Cherokee woman and his great-grandfather was a Black American man who descended from enslaved Nigerians. There is no documented evidence that Lumumba is of Cherokee descent, and such claims may stem from a family oral tradition or myth rather than verifiable genealogy. His parents had each moved to Detroit in the Great Migration of the early 20th century.

Raised Catholic, Lumumba attended local Catholic schools. He graduated from St. Theresa High School in Detroit, where he served as president of the student council and captain of the football team. As a young man he witnessed police brutality. His mother would stand with her children on corners collecting money for the Student Nonviolent Coordinating Committee, and her determination gave him a foundation for organizing.

The assassination of Martin Luther King Jr. on April 4, 1968, had a deep effect on young Lumumba. The day following King's assassination, he took part in the occupation of a university building at Western Michigan University. The students protested the lack of African-American faculty among other academic demands.

He majored in political science and graduated from Kalamazoo College in 1969, where he formed the Black United Front to advocate for African-American studies in Midwestern higher educational institutions.

== Political career ==
Lumumba became more involved in Black Nationalist politics. In 1969 he changed his name to Chokwe (after the Chokwe people, an ethnic group in Central Africa that resisted slavery) Lumumba (after Patrice Lumumba, assassinated leader of the Congo). He was elected in 1971 to the cabinet of the Republic of New Afrika as the second vice president. As second vice president, he accompanied other members when the capital of the provisional government was moved to Hinds County, Mississippi, and dedicated at a farm there on March 28, 1971. This site was considered a center of the former black-majority states claimed by the RNA for the new country.

He was in the lead car with Alajo Abegbalola which was halted by the Bolton police on that day when the "Land Celebration" was set to take place, marking the establishment of the capital of the Republic of New Afrika.

== Legal career ==
Lumumba finished first in his law school class, graduating cum laude from Wayne State University Law School in 1975. While there he created the Malcolm X Center and worked as a staff attorney in the Detroit Public Defenders Office.

He formed a law firm in Detroit in 1978 and successfully defended 16 prisoners who faced murder charges after a riot in a prison in Pontiac, Illinois. He was initially barred from representing Cynthia Boston, known as Fulani Sunni Ali, a member of a revolutionary group charged in a Brink's robbery case; she was jailed on $500,000 bond. Many national legal groups protested the barring of Lumumba from representing the prisoner and the characterization of him as a terrorist due to his membership in the Republic of New Afrika. In 1983 while handling the Brink's case, Lumumba was held in contempt by the federal judge for his press comments.

He worked on the Geronimo Pratt case and encouraged black youth to eschew gang activities and participate in global actions such as protesting apartheid in South Africa. During the 1980s, there was a marked increase in the number of imprisoned African Americans in the United States, due in part to mandatory sentencing guidelines. Lumumba became interested in organizing to demand reparations for the damage done to the generations of African-American slaves, which he believed had contributed to contemporary problems of blacks in the United States. In September 1987 at Harvard Law School, as a co-founder of the National Coalition of Blacks for Reparations in America, Lumumba addressed a conference sponsored by the National Conference of Black Lawyers. He discussed the constitutional neglect of the needs of enslaved persons.

In 1988 Lumumba returned to Jackson, Mississippi. Three years later he was granted the right to practice law. He was a public defender on contract with the City of Jackson's consortium to represent the indigent citizens of the municipality. In 1994 Lumumba sued to have a public defender contract voided. In 1999, Lumumba was the defense attorney for Curtis Flowers. In 2000 Judge Swan Yerger dismissed a lawsuit which Lumumba filed against a police officer. The Mississippi Bar publicly reprimanded Lumumba after the judge found him in contempt. In a Leake County case he was found in contempt and publicly reprimanded. After an unsuccessful appeal to the Mississippi Supreme Court, he served three days in the county jail when bond was refused. He lost his license to practice law for six months.

== Jackson city council ==
In 2009 Lumumba was elected to the Jackson Ward Two council seat with the help of the Malcolm X Grassroots Movement, which he had helped found. He also gained support from the Jackson People's Assembly, the Mississippi Disaster Relief Coalition, and other community activists. He served as chairman of the New African Peoples Organization and co-sponsored the Washington D.C. rally, Occupy the Justice Department. In 2010, he addressed the New Black Panther Party in Atlanta. He helped the Mississippi Public Broadcasting agency in an anti-dropout campaign for young students.

== 2013 mayoral race ==
In 2013, Lumumba ran for mayor of Jackson, first running in the primary for the Democratic nomination. By the evening of May 7, 2013, it was announced that Lumumba had forced Jonathan Lee into a runoff election and that the incumbent, Harvey Johnson Jr., had been soundly defeated in each municipal ward. Lumumba had led in at least five of the seven wards. Prior to the primary election on May 7 Lumumba had raised only $69,000, one-fifth of Jonathan Lee's campaign chest, but projected that the challenger's grassroots work would be more decisive in the upcoming runoff. On May 15, attorney Regina Quinn, the fourth-place Democratic primary finisher, endorsed Lumumba for his stance on infrastructure development as an economic stimulus for local Jackson businesses and his insistence that the city pay women equally with men in like positions.

On May 21, 2013, Lumumba defeated Jonathan Lee by over 3,000 votes and bested his opponent in five out of the seven municipal wards. Lee gained more votes from the wards with higher populations of whites. With negligible opposition in the June 4th general election, Lumumba easily became the mayor-elect for the capital of Mississippi. The next day, Lumumba publicly questioned the significance of Christopher Columbus as "discoverer of America", generating some controversy. He was sworn in as Mayor on July 1, 2013.

As mayor, he successfully advocated for a sales tax to fund pothole and sewer repair.

== Death ==
Lumumba died on February 25, 2014, at the age of 66. City officials said he died at St. Dominic Hospital in Jackson. The cause of death was not immediately clear since Sharon Grisham-Stewart, the Hinds County coroner, refused to perform an autopsy after Lumumba's mysterious death following complaints of a cold. Hinds County Supervisor Kenneth Stokes and others believe Lumumba was murdered. City Councilman Quentin Whitwell told reporters that Lumumba died of heart failure. The New York Times said in its obituary of Lumumba that "being the progressive black mayor of a black-majority Southern capital ultimately may not have been a far cry from the black self-determination he once sought."

== Personal life ==
Lumumba's son, Chokwe Antar Lumumba, is also a lawyer and was a partner in his father's practice, and is the former mayor of Jackson, Mississippi.

He attended Jackson United Methodist Church in Jackson.

== Legacy ==
The grassroots organization Cooperation Jackson, which seeks to build on many of the values Lumumba fought for, named their headquarters building the Chokwe Lumumba Center for Economic Democracy and Development.

Warren Avenue in Detroit, Michigan, on the campus of Wayne State University, is called Chokwe Lumumba Ave in his honor.

== See also ==
- List of elected socialist mayors in the United States
