= Chokwe Antar Lumumba =

American attorney, activist, and politician

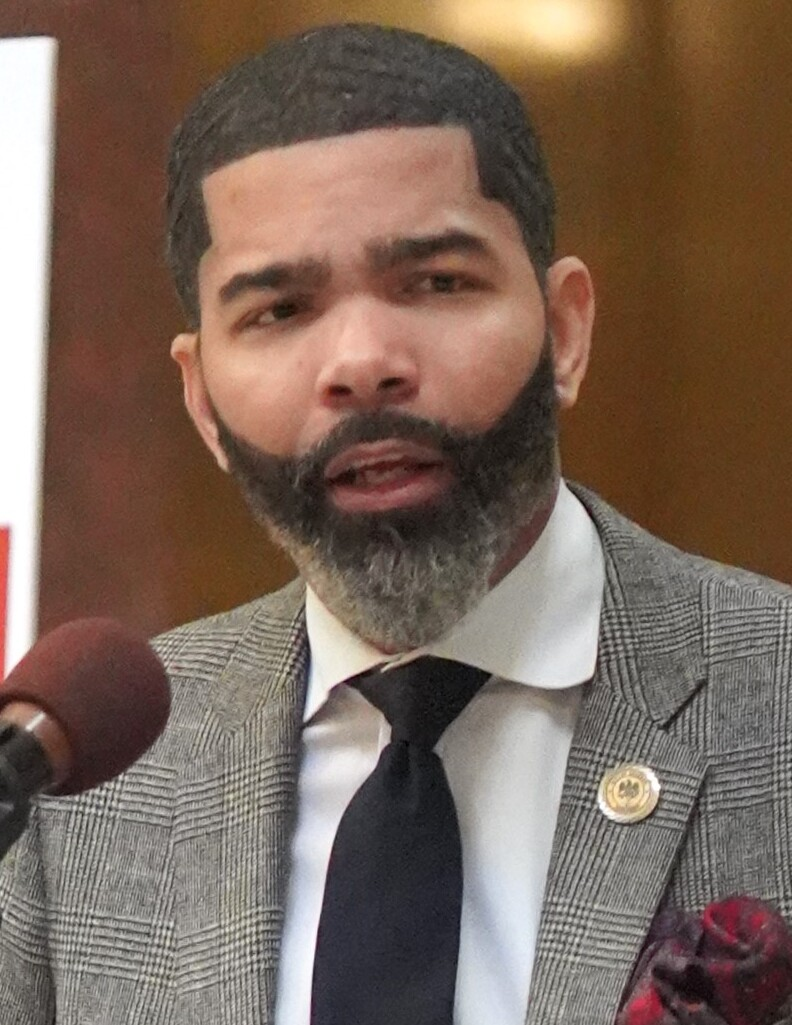
- Lumumba in 2024

53rd Mayor of Jackson
- In office July 3, 2017 – July 1, 2025
- Preceded by: Tony Yarber
- Succeeded by: John Horhn

Personal details
- Born: March 29, 1983 (age 43)
- Party: Democratic
- Spouse: Ebony Lumumba
- Children: 2
- Relatives: Chokwe Lumumba (father)
- Education: Tuskegee University (BA); Texas Southern University (JD)

Chokwe Antar Lumumba (born March 29, 1983) is an American attorney, activist, and politician who served as the 53rd mayor of Jackson, Mississippi, from 2017 to 2025. He was elected in 2017 at age 34, becoming the youngest person elected mayor in the city's history. Lumumba is the son of former Jackson mayor and civil rights attorney Chokwe Lumumba, who served as mayor from 2013 until his death in 2014.

Lumumba was first elected mayor after defeating incumbent Tony Yarber and state senator John Horhn in the 2017 Democratic primary, then winning the general election in a landslide. During his mayoralty, Jackson faced major challenges involving its aging water system, a 2022 drinking-water emergency, conflicts with state officials over local control, and disputes with the city council over municipal contracts. Lumumba won reelection in 2021, becoming the first Jackson mayor in 20 years to win consecutive terms.

In 2024, Lumumba, Hinds County District Attorney Jody Owens, and Jackson City Council member Aaron Banks were indicted on federal bribery and related charges tied to a proposed downtown development project. Lumumba pleaded not guilty and denied wrongdoing. He sought a third term in 2025 but was defeated by Horhn in the Democratic primary runoff. Lumumba pled guilty in July 2026.

== Early life, education, and legal career ==
Lumumba is the son of Chokwe Lumumba and Nubia Lumumba, both of whom were involved in community organizing and civil rights work. His father, born Edwin Finley Taliaferro, was an attorney, Black nationalist activist, and member of the Republic of New Afrika before entering Jackson city politics.

Lumumba earned a Bachelor of Arts degree from Tuskegee University. He later earned a Juris Doctor from the Thurgood Marshall School of Law at Texas Southern University, along with a certificate in sports and entertainment law. After law school, he returned to Jackson and worked as an attorney, including as a junior associate at Lumumba, Freelon, & Associates.

== Political views ==
Lumumba has described himself as a progressive, a socialist, and a political revolutionary. His politics have often been discussed in connection with the organizing tradition associated with his father, the Malcolm X Grassroots Movement, and local efforts in Jackson around participatory democracy and economic self-determination. During his 2017 campaign and early mayoralty, national coverage focused on his pledge to make Jackson "the most radical city on the planet."

Lumumba endorsed Bernie Sanders in the 2020 Democratic Party presidential primaries. Sanders endorsed Lumumba for reelection as mayor in 2021.

== 2014 mayoral campaign ==
After the death of Mayor Chokwe Lumumba in February 2014, Chokwe Antar Lumumba ran in the special election to succeed his father as mayor. He advanced to a runoff against city council president Tony Yarber. Yarber defeated Lumumba in the April 22, 2014 runoff, receiving about 54 percent of the vote to Lumumba's 46 percent.

== Mayor of Jackson, Mississippi ==
=== 2017 election ===
Lumumba ran for mayor again in 2017. In the Democratic primary, he defeated incumbent mayor Tony Yarber, state senator John Horhn, and other candidates, winning the nomination without a runoff. He won the June 2017 general election with more than 90 percent of the vote and was sworn in on July 3, 2017.

At 34, Lumumba became the youngest person elected mayor of Jackson. He was also the seventh consecutive African-American mayor of the city.

=== First term ===
During Lumumba's first term, his administration emphasized infrastructure, public safety oversight, digital access, and public education partnerships. In 2018, Lumumba attended the Bloomberg Harvard City Leadership Initiative, a program for mayors and senior city officials. Later that year, Jackson received a $1 million Bloomberg Philanthropies Public Art Challenge grant for a project focused on food insecurity.

=== Jackson Zoo ===
In 2018, after the Jackson Zoo announced that it would consider moving from its longtime West Jackson location, Lumumba opposed the move and joined community groups calling for the zoo to remain in West Jackson. In 2019, the zoo temporarily closed for renovations and work related to federal licensing requirements. It reopened in August 2020 under city control.

=== Jackson water crisis ===
Jackson's water and sewer systems were a central issue during Lumumba's mayoralty. The city's infrastructure problems predated his administration and included aging treatment plants, sewer overflows, billing problems, and repeated boil-water notices. In 2019 and 2020, large releases of sewage into the Pearl River drew renewed attention to the condition of the city's wastewater system.

In 2021, Lumumba asked Mississippi governor Tate Reeves for state assistance to address water infrastructure needs after winter storms disrupted service. The crisis deepened in August 2022, when flooding and operational failures at the O. B. Curtis Water Treatment Plant left many residents without reliable water service. The city declared a water system emergency, and state and federal agencies became involved in emergency response.

In November 2022, the United States Department of Justice, acting on behalf of the United States Environmental Protection Agency, filed a complaint against the City of Jackson alleging failures to provide drinking water reliably compliant with the Safe Drinking Water Act. The city, the state health department, and the federal government agreed to a proposed stipulated order appointing an interim third-party manager to stabilize the drinking-water system. Ted Henifin was appointed interim third-party manager, giving him authority over operations, billing, and priority infrastructure projects for the city's drinking-water system.

In January 2023, Lumumba announced that Jackson had secured nearly $800 million in federal funding for water-system repairs and reconstruction.

=== Garbage collection dispute ===
Lumumba's administration was involved in a prolonged dispute with the Jackson City Council over a residential garbage-collection contract. In 2022, after the council rejected an emergency contract with Richard's Disposal, Lumumba attempted to veto the council's refusal to approve the contract. The Mississippi Supreme Court ruled in 2023 that the mayor could not veto a negative action of the city council and upheld the trial court's judgment against him.

=== State-city conflicts ===
Lumumba frequently opposed efforts by Mississippi state officials to expand state control over Jackson institutions. In 2023, he criticized legislation that would create a separate court system with appointed judges in part of Jackson and expand the jurisdiction of the state-run Capitol Police. Lumumba described the proposal as racially motivated and said it undermined local self-government in the majority-Black capital city.

The same year, the state legislature considered but did not advance a proposal to create a state-dominated board to oversee Jackson's water system after the interim third-party manager's work. The Associated Press reported that Lumumba had "sharply criticized" attempts by state lawmakers to assert state control in Jackson.

=== 2021 reelection ===
Lumumba won reelection in 2021 with almost 70 percent of the vote. WAPT reported that he became the first Jackson mayor in 20 years to win reelection to a consecutive second term.

=== Federal indictment ===
On November 7, 2024, the United States Department of Justice announced that Lumumba, Hinds County District Attorney Jody Owens, and Jackson City Council member Aaron Banks had been charged with bribery and related offenses. The indictment alleged that officials accepted bribes in exchange for official acts benefiting purported real estate developers connected to a downtown hotel project.

Lumumba was charged with one count of conspiracy to commit federal program bribery, honest services wire fraud, and money laundering; one count of federal program bribery; one count of using a facility in interstate commerce in furtherance of unlawful activity; one count of honest services wire fraud; and one count of money laundering. The Justice Department noted that "an indictment is merely an allegation" and that all defendants are presumed innocent unless proven guilty. Lumumba pleaded not guilty and denied accepting bribes.

In March 2025, a federal judge set trial for July 13, 2026. In 2026, Lumumba, Owens, and Banks plead guilty in federal court to conspiracy charges. Lumumba admitted to accepting $50,000 in campaign contributions in exchange for official action on a hotel project.

== 2025 mayoral election ==
Lumumba sought a third term in the 2025 Jackson mayoral election. In the April 1 Democratic primary, he advanced to a runoff against state senator John Horhn. Horhn led the first round with about 48 percent of the vote, while Lumumba received about 17 percent.

Horhn defeated Lumumba in the April 22 runoff. The Mississippi Free Press reported that, with 79 of 80 precincts reporting, Horhn led Lumumba by about 75 percent to 25 percent. Lumumba conceded the race and said his work would continue outside the mayor's office.

Horhn won the June 3, 2025 general election and began his term as mayor on July 1, 2025.

== Personal life ==
Lumumba is married to Ebony Lumumba, an academic and professor at Jackson State University. The couple has two children.

== See also ==
- List of mayors of Jackson, Mississippi
- Jackson, Mississippi water crisis

Political offices
Preceded by Tony Yarber	Mayor of Jackson; 2017–2025	Succeeded by John Horhn
