= UAS groups of the United States military =

Classifications of unmanned aerial systems

The U.S. Department of Defense (DoD) classifies unmanned aerial systems (UAS) into "Groups" according to their size and capability, a joint system that replaced the service branches' separate categorization schemes in 2011.

The "Group" system has five categories, whose capabilities increase with the number.

Group	Maximum weight (lb) (MGTOW)	Nominal operating altitude (ft)	Speed (kn)	Examples
1	0–20	< 1,200 AGL	100	RQ-11 Raven, WASP, Puma
2	21–55	< 3,500 AGL	< 250	ScanEagle, Flexrotor, SIC5, PDW C100
3	< 1,320	< FL 180	< 250	Shield AI V-BAT, RQ-7B Shadow, RQ-21 Blackjack, Navmar RQ-23 Tigershark, Arcturus-UAV Jump 20, Arcturus T-20, SIC25, Resolute ISR Resolute Eagle, Vanilla Unmanned
4	> 1,320	< FL 180	Any	MQ-8B Fire Scout, MQ-1A/B Predator, MQ-1C Gray Eagle
5	> 1,320	> FL 180	Any	MQ-9 Reaper, RQ-4 Global Hawk, MQ-4C Triton, Skydweller Aero (former Solar Impulse airframe)

== Earlier categorization schemes ==
=== Tier systems ===
From about 2004 to 2011, U.S. military planners used various "Tier systems" to designate the various elements in an overall plan for integrated operations. The Tiers do not refer to specific models of aircraft, but rather roles the aircraft would fill. The U.S. Air Force, U.S. Marine Corps, and U.S. Army each have their own tier system.

==== U.S. Air Force tiers ====
- Tier N/A: Small/Micro UAV. Role filled by BATMAV (Wasp Block III).
- Tier I: Low altitude, long endurance. Role filled by the Gnat 750.
- Tier II: Medium Altitude, Long Endurance (MALE). Role currently filled by the Predator and MQ-9 Reaper.
- Tier II+: High Altitude, Long Endurance conventional UAV (or HALE UAV). Altitude: 60,000 to 65,000 feet (19,800 m), less than 300 knots (560 km/h) airspeed, 3,000-nautical-mile (6,000 km) radius, 24‑hour time-on-station capability. Complementary to the Tier III- aircraft. Role currently filled by the RQ-4 Global Hawk.
- Tier III-: High altitude, long endurance low-observable UAV. Same parameters as, and complementary to, the Tier II+ aircraft. The RQ-3 DarkStar was originally intended to fulfill this role before it was "terminated". Role now filled by RQ-170 Sentinel.

==== U.S. Marine Corps tiers ====
- Tier N/A: Micro UAV. Wasp III fills this role, driven largely by the desire for commonality with the USAF BATMAV.
- Tier I: Role currently filled by the Dragon Eye but all ongoing and future procurement for the Dragon Eye program is going now to the RQ-11B Raven B.
- Tier II: Role currently filled by the Scan Eagle and the AAI RQ-7 Shadow.
- Tier III: For two decades, the role of medium range tactical UAV was filled by the Pioneer UAV. In July 2007, the Marine Corps announced its intention to retire the aging Pioneer fleet and transition to the RQ-7 Shadow tactical unmanned aircraft system by AAI Corporation. The first Marine Shadow systems have already been delivered, and training for their respective Marine Corps units is underway.

Role currently filled by the AAI RQ-7 Shadow, although USMC planners do not view this aircraft as meeting future Tier III requirements.

==== U.S. Army tiers ====
- Tier I: Small UAV. Role filled by the RQ-11A/B Raven.
- Tier II: Short Range Tactical UAV. Role filled by the RQ-7A/B Shadow 200.
- Tier III: Medium Range Tactical UAV. Role formerly filled by the MQ-5A/B Hunter and IGNAT/IGNAT-ER, but has transitioned to the Extended Range Multi-Purpose (ERMP) MQ-1C Gray Eagle.

=== Future Combat Systems (Cancelled) ===
UAS were grouped in four classes under the Future Combat Systems, which was the Army's principal modernization program from 2003 to early 2009:

- Class I: For small units. Role to be filled by all new UAV with some similarity to Micro Air Vehicle.
- Class II: For companies (cancelled).
- Class III: For battalions (cancelled).
- Class IV: For brigades. Role to be filled by the RQ-8A/B / MQ-8B Fire Scout.
