= The Flying Keys =

American barnstorming pilots and military pilots

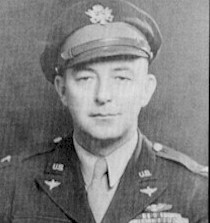

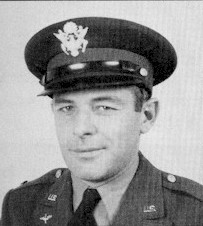

Fred and Al Key were brothers who performed barnstorming events and other activities during the early 20th century. They are best known for their flight endurance record, which they cemented at twenty-seven days. They also invented a valve for aerial refueling that became the industry standard for the United States military.

== Early history and record attempt ==
Brothers Fred and Al Key became interested in aviation after World War I. They started doing some barnstorming in the 1920s and continued their interest as the managers of the Meridian Municipal Airport, in Meridian, Mississippi.

With the onset of the Great Depression, the city of Meridian began doing whatever it could to save money. The airport was considered unnecessary, given the economic conditions, and was slated to be closed.

The Key brothers had no desire to see this happen, so they came up with a plan to draw attention to Meridian and its airport by breaking the standing flight endurance record of 23 days. At that time, air-to-air refueling was a dangerous affair. If gasoline was spilled, which often happened, it could be ignited by the hot engine exhaust.

To solve this problem, the Key brothers, along with local inventor and mechanic A. D. Hunter, invented a spill-free fueling system that consisted of a valve on the end of the fuel nozzle which was opened by a probe in the neck of the fuel tank. The valve would not allow fuel to flow unless it was inserted into the fuel tank. During fueling, if the nozzle was removed from the tank, the fuel would automatically stop flowing. This nozzle was later adopted by the US Army Air Corps, and is still in use today with some modifications.

Refueling the plane wasn't their only concern. The engine needed regular maintenance during the flight in order to stay in good running order. To facilitate this, a catwalk was built so that Fred could walk out and work on the plane while it was airborne.

On June 4, 1935, The Flying Keys, as the brothers later became known, lifted off in a borrowed Curtiss Robin monoplane named Ole Miss from Meridian, Mississippi's airport. For the next twenty-seven days, they flew over the Meridian vicinity. Several times each day, the crew of a similar plane would lower food and supplies to the brothers on the end of a rope, as well as supply fuel via a long flexible tube. They landed on July 1 after traveling an estimated 52,320 miles and used more than 6,000 gallons of gasoline.

Their non-stop endurance flight lasted 653 hours, 34 minutes. The Ole Miss is permanently displayed in the National Air and Space Museum in Washington, D.C.

After this historic flight, Meridian's public airport was renamed Key Field in the brothers' honor.

According to Owen, the brothers' flight boosted confidence in aviation nationally. People figured if the Key brothers made their flight safely in such a small plane, then the big commercial airplanes were definitely safe.

== World War II ==
The Key brothers both served as bomber pilots during World War II. Fred was awarded the Distinguished Flying Cross (USA).

Al was the commanding officer of the 66th Squadron (part of the 44th Bombardment Group) flying Consolidated B-24 Liberators from England. By the time he was taken off combat missions in 1943 he had earned a Distinguished Flying Cross, Distinguished Service Cross, an Air Medal, a Distinguished Service Cross from the British and seven Bronze Stars for participating in combat.

== Postwar activities ==
Al remained in the Air Force until his retirement in 1960 at the rank of full Colonel, after which he was elected mayor of Meridian in 1965 and 1969; he was unseated in 1973 by a Republican, Tom Stuart.

Fred Key ran the Key Brothers Flying Service at Key Field until his death in 1971. The cutoff valve developed for the Keys by A.D. Hunter was an important innovation for national defense, being the precursor of those used by modern tanker airplanes, such as the KC-135 Stratotanker, that keep bombers and fighter aircraft in the air. Today, with only slight modifications, U.S. Air Force and Strategic Air Command airplanes use the valve that Hunter invented.
