= List of flight endurance records =

Length of time an aircraft of a particular category spent in flight without landing

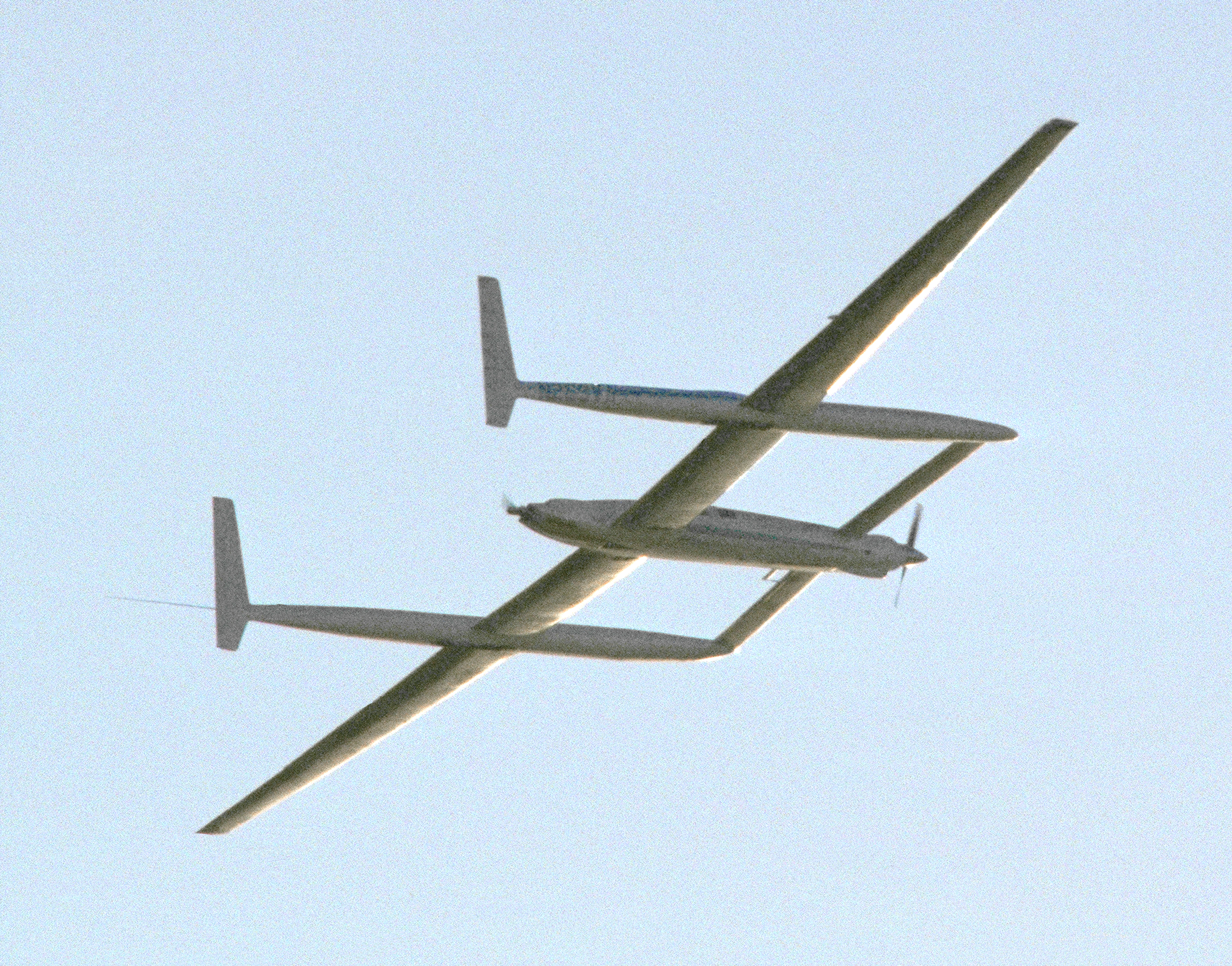
The current record for the longest non-stop, non-refueled airplane flight in history (9 days and 3 minutes) was achieved in the Rutan Voyager

The flight endurance record is the longest amount of time an aircraft of a particular category spent in flight without landing. It can be a solo event, or multiple people can take turns piloting the aircraft, as long as all pilots remain in the aircraft. The limit initially was the amount of fuel that could be stored for the flight, but aerial refueling extended that parameter. Due to safety concerns, the Fédération Aéronautique Internationale (FAI) no longer recognizes new records for the duration of crewed airplane or glider flights and has never recognized any duration records for helicopters.

== Airplane ==
=== Non-refueled, crewed ===
Duration (dd:hh:mm:ss)	Date	Location	Pilots	Aircraft	Comments	Reference
09:00:03:44	December 14–23, 1986	Edwards Air Force Base, US, circumnavigation	Dick Rutan and Jeana Yeager	Rutan Voyager		
04:21:51:00	June 28 to July 3, 2015	Nagoya, Japan – Kalaeloa Airport, Hawaii, United States (8263 kilometres)	André Borschberg	Solar Impulse 2	Solar plane, without any fuel; also longest solo airplane flight of any type	
03:12:32:00	May 25–28, 1931	Jacksonville, Florida, US	Walter Edwin Lees and Frederic Brossy	Bellanca J-2	Last record recognized by FAI	
03:04:45:00	February 8–11, 2004	Kennedy Space Center, Florida, US	Steve Fossett	Global Flyer		
03:03:23:07	February 26 to March 1, 1931	La Sénia, Algeria	Lucien Bossoutrot and Maurice Rossi	Blériot 110		
02:19:13:55	May 30 to June 2, 1930	Montecelio, Italy	Umberto Maddalena and Fausto Cecconi	Savoia-Marchetti S.64		
02:17:25:00	July 5–7, 1928	Dessau, Germany	Johann Risztics and Wilhelm Zimmermann	Junkers W 33	Also surpassed the refueled record	
02:04:22:31.8	August 3–5, 1927	Dessau, Germany	Cornelius Edzard and Johann Risztics	Junkers W 33		
02:03:11:25	April 12–14, 1927	Long Island, New York, US	Clarence Duncan Chamberlin and Bertrand Blanchard Acosta	Wright-Bellanca WB-2 "Columbia"		
01:21:11:59	August 7–9, 1925	Chartres, France	Maurice Drouhin and Jules Landry	Farman F.60 Goliath		
01:13:59:10	July 16–17, 1924	Chartres, France	Etienne Coupet and Maurice Drouhin	Farman F-60	Also surpassed the refueled record	
01:12:04:34	April 16–17, 1923	Wilbur Wright Field, Dayton, Ohio, US	Oakley George Kelly and John Arthur Macready	Fokker T-2		
01:10:14:07	October 14–15, 1922	Le Bourget, France	Lucien Bossoutrot and Robert Drouhin	Farman F.60 Goliath		
01:02:19:35	December 29–30, 1921	Roosevelt Field, New York, US; FAI record says Jacksonville, Florida	Edward A. Stinson and Lloyd Bertaud	Junkers-Larsen JL-6	First record recognized by FAI	
01:00:19:07	June 3–4, 1920	Ville Sauvage la Dordogne, France	Lucien Bossoutrot and Jean Bernard	Farman F.60 Goliath		
01:00:12:00	July 10–11, 1914	Johannisthal Air Field near Berlin, Germany	Reinhold Böhm	Albatros biplane		
00:21:49:00	June 28–29, 1914	Johannisthal Air Field near Berlin, Germany	Werner Landmann	Albatros biplane		
00:13:22:00	September 11, 1912	Étampes airfield in France	Alexandre Fourny (Fourney)	Maurice Farman MF-2		
00:11:01:29	September 1, 1911	Buc, France	Alexandre Fourny (Fourney)	Maurice Farman biplane		
00:08:12:45	December 18, 1910	Étampes airfield in France	Henri Farman	Maurice Farman biplane		
00:06:01:00	October 28, 1910	Buc, France	Maurice Tabuteau	Maurice Farman MF-2		
00:05:03:05	July 10, 1910	Reims, France	Jan Olieslagers	Blériot monoplane		
00:04:17:35	November 3, 1909	Mourmelon-le-Grand, France	Henri Farman	H. Farman		
00:02:18:33.6	December 31, 1908	Camp d’Auvours near Le Mans, France	Wilbur Wright	Wright Model A		
00:01:54:00.4	December 18, 1908	Camp d’Auvours near Le Mans, France	Wilbur Wright	Wright Model A		
00:01:31:25.8	September 21, 1908	Camp d’Auvours near Le Mans, France	Wilbur Wright	Wright Model A		
00:01:14:20	September 12, 1908	Fort Myer, Virginia, US	Orville Wright	Wright Model A		
00:01:10:24	September 11, 1908	Fort Myer, Virginia, US	Orville Wright	Wright Model A		
00:01:05:52	September 10, 1908	Fort Myer, Virginia	Orville Wright	Wright Model A		
00:01:02:15	September 9, 1908	Fort Myer, Virginia, US	Orville Wright	Wright Model A		
00:00:59:23.8	October 5, 1905	Huffman Prairie, Ohio, US	Wilbur Wright	Wright Flyer III		
00:00:33:17	October 4, 1905	Huffman Prairie, Ohio, US	Orville Wright	Wright Flyer III		
00:00:26:11.2	October 3, 1905	Huffman Prairie, Ohio, US	Orville Wright	Wright Flyer III		
00:00:19:56	September 29, 1905	Huffman Prairie, Ohio, US	Orville Wright	Wright Flyer III		
00:00:18:11	September 26, 1905	Huffman Prairie, Ohio, US	Wilbur Wright	Wright Flyer III		
00:00:05:41	September 12, 1905	Huffman Prairie, Ohio, YS	Wilbur Wright	Wright Flyer III		
00:00:05:04	November 9, 1904	Huffman Prairie, Ohio, US	Wilbur Wright	Wright Flyer II		
00:00:01:38	October 14, 1904	Huffman Prairie, Ohio, US	Orville Wright	Wright Flyer II		
00:00:01:35	September 20, 1904	Huffman Prairie, Ohio, US	Wilbur Wright	Wright Flyer II		
00:00:00:59	December 17, 1903	Kitty Hawk, North Carolina, US	Wilbur Wright	Wright Flyer		
00:00:00:12	December 17, 1903	Kitty Hawk, North Carolina, US	Orville Wright	Wright Flyer	First flight	

=== Refueled, crewed ===
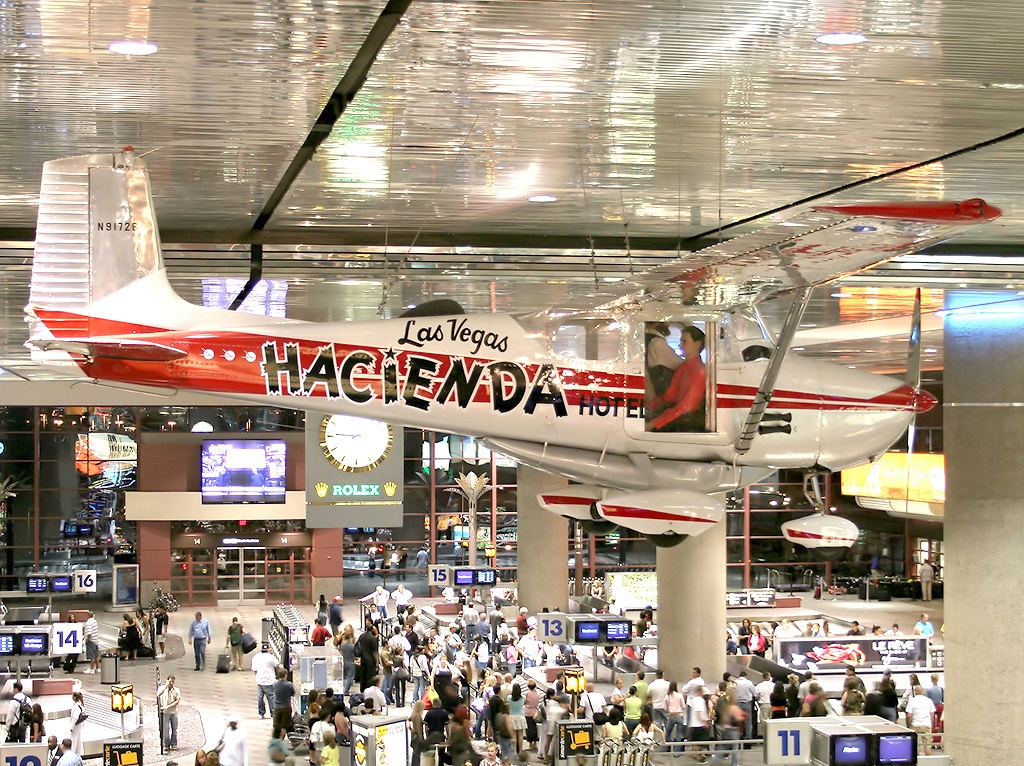
The Cessna 172, used by Robert Timm and John Cook, hanging in Harry Reid International Airport.

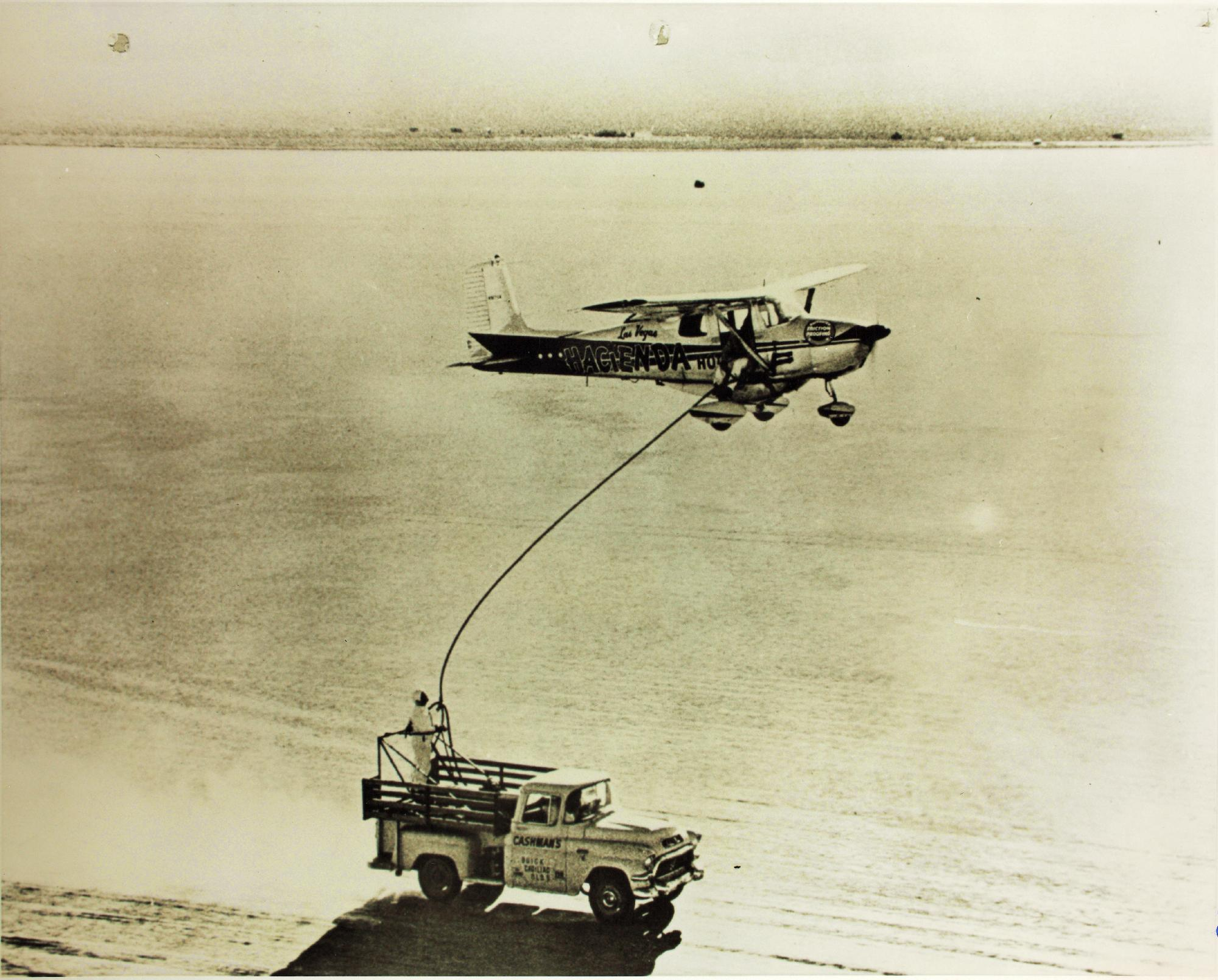
Robert Timm and John Cook Cessna 172 refueling

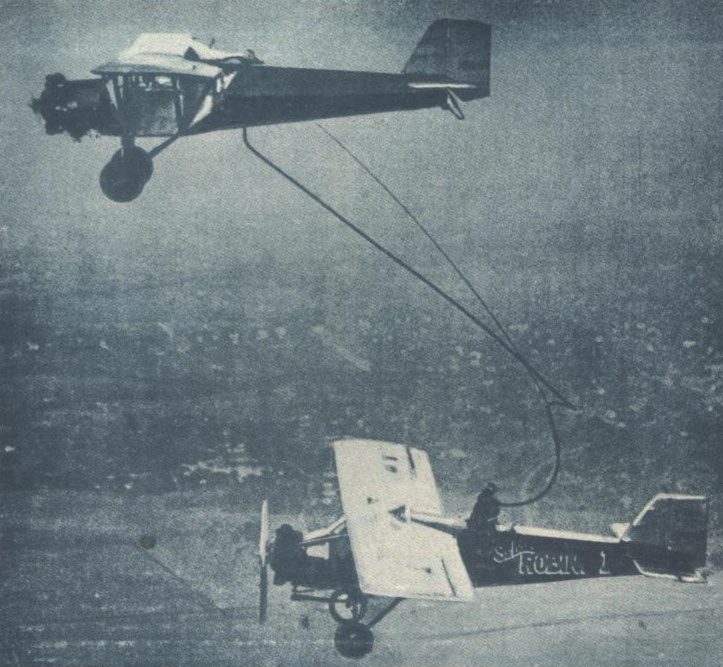
The aircraft Curtiss Robin "St. Louis" during the record flight July 13–30, 1929, St. Louis, Missouri.

Duration (dd:hh:mm:ss)	Date	Location	Pilots	Aircraft	Comments	Reference
64:22:19:05	December 4, 1958, to February 7, 1959	Las Vegas, Nevada	Robert Timm and John Cook	Cessna 172; Hacienda	Refueled from moving truck on ground	
50:00:18:20	August 2, 1958, to September 21, 1958	Dallas, Texas, US	Jim Heth and Bill Burkhart	Cessna 172; The Old Scotchman	Refueled from moving truck on ground	
46:20:00:00	August 24 to October 10, 1949	Yuma, Arizona, US	Bob Woodhouse and Woody Jongeward	Aeronca 15AC Sedan; City of Yuma	Attempted to persuade government officials to reopen Yuma Army Air Field	
42:00:02:00	March 15 to April 26, 1949	Fullerton, California, US	Dick Riedel and Bill Barris	Aeronca 15AC Sedan; Sunkist Lady		
30:06:00:00	October 1–30, 1939	Long Beach, California, US	Wes Carroll and Clyde Schlieper	Piper J-3 Cub floatplane Spirit of Kay		
22:07:45:00	October 1- 23, 1939	Muncie, Indiana, US	Robert McDaniels and Kelvin Baxter	Piper Franklin 50 Cub Miss Sun Tan	Jim Fidler provided on-air coverage of flight through WLBC broadcasts. Pilots met Eleanor Roosevelt following flight.	
27:05:34:00	June 4 to July 1, 1935	Meridian, Mississippi, US	Brothers Al and Fred Key	Curtiss Robin; Ole Miss	Invented a spill-free mid-air refueling nozzle. Inaccessible recording altimeter verified duration.	
23:01:41:30	June 11 and July 4, 1930	Chicago, Illinois, US	Brothers John and Kenneth Hunter	Stinson SM-1 Detroiter; The City of Chicago		
17:12:17:00	July 13–30, 1929	St. Louis, Missouri, US	Dale Jackson and Forest O'Brine	Curtiss Robin; St. Louis		
10:06:43:32	July 2–12, 1929	Culver City, California, US	Loren W. Mendell and Roland B. Reinhart	Buhl CA-5A Airsedan; Angeleno		
07:06:00:00	June 30 to July 6, 1929	Cleveland, Ohio, US	Roy Mitchell and Byron K. Newcomb	Stinson SM-1 Detroiter; The City of Cleveland	Not recognized as an official record by FAI because it did not exceed previous record by at least 1%.	
07:04:31:01	May 19–26, 1929	Ft. Worth, Texas, US	Reginald Robbins and James Kelly	Mahoney-Ryan B-1 Brougham; Fort Worth		
06:15:40:00	January 1–7, 1929	Van Nuys Airport, California, US	Maj. Carl Spaatz, Capt. Ira Eaker, 1st Lt. Harry A. Halverson, 2nd Lt. Elwood Quesada, and Sgt. Roy W. Hooe	Atlantic-Fokker C2A; Question Mark		
02:12:01:30	June 2–4, 1928	Tirlemont, Belgium	Louis Crooy and Sgt. Victor Groenen	de Havilland DH-9		
01:13:15:14	August 27–28, 1923	Rockwell Field, California, US	Capt. Lowell Smith and 1st Lt. John Paul Richter	de Havilland DH-4B	First refueled flight to surpass the non-refueled record	

=== Airline, scheduled ===
Duration (hh:mm:ss)	Date	Location	Pilots	Aircraft	Comments	Reference
32:09:00	June 29, 1943 – July 18, 1945 (Note: Note The "Double Sunrise" route continued to be operated from July 18, 1945 until April 6, 1946 by Qantas Liberators (loaned from BOAC) and Qantas Avro Lancastrians, but with shorter flown distances (departing what is now PER, stopping for refuelling at the RAF base at Minneriya, and landing at what is now CMB) and shorter flight times (faster cruise speeds).)	Swan River, Nedlands, Western Australia to Lake Koggala, Ceylon (now Sri Lanka)	several Qantas crews	Qantas Consolidated PBY Catalina	Called "The Double Sunrise" (3513 mi.) 271 crossings	
23:19:00	October 1–2, 1957	London to San Francisco	44 persons (12 crew, 32 passengers). Capt. Gordon Granger and co-pilot Herbert Ottewill	TWA Lockheed Constellation L-1649A, F/N 307 / N7307C	(c.5350 mi.)	
19:36:00	October 21–22, 1936	San Francisco to Pearl Harbor, Hawaii	Capt. Edwin Musick, FO Harold Gray, JO M.C. Weber, NAV Fred Noonan + 4 additional flightcrew.	Pan Am Martin M-130 Flying Boat	(c. 2405 mi.)	

=== Airplane, uncrewed ===
Duration (dd:hh:mm:ss)	Date	Location	Aircraft	Class
67:06:52:00	2025-04-28	Kenya	AALTO HAPS Ltd Zephyr	non FAI sanctioned, solar power (in-fight termination)
64:18:26:00	2022-08-19	US, Arizona, Yuma	Airbus Zephyr 8 (S)	non FAI sanctioned, solar power (broke up in flight)
25:23:57:00	2018-08-05	US, Arizona, Yuma	Airbus Zephyr 8	non FAI sanctioned, 75 kg, solar power
18:22:30:00	2021-09-13	US, Arizona, Yuma	Airbus Zephyr 8	U-Absolute, U-1 (Fixed wing), 25–100 kg, electric
14:00:22:00	2010-07-23	US, Arizona, Yuma	QinetiQ Zephyr 7	U-Absolute, U-1.c (50–500 kg), electric
08:00:50:00	2021-10-02	US, California, Edwards AFB	Vanilla Unmanned	U-1 (Fixed wing), 100–500 kg, IC and Jet
08:00:14:00	2026-04-26	US, Stennis airport, Kiln, Mississippi	Skydweller	unmanned solar (crashed)
05:01:24:00	2017-10-23	US, Virginia, Wallops	Vanilla Aircraft VA001	non FAI sanctioned
04:11:00:00	2022-09-22	US, California, NAS Pt. Mugu	Vanilla Unmanned	non FAI sanctioned
03:09:24:00	2014-12-08	Switzerland, Rafz	ETH Zurich AtlantikSolar	non FAI sanctioned, 6.8 kg, solar power
03:08:02:00	2014-12-08	US, California, Ridgecrest	Aurora FS Orion	U-1.f (5-10 t), IC and Jet
03:03:57:00	2023-07-09	US, Eastern Oregon Regional Airport	Kraus Hamdani Aerospace K1000ULE	non FAI sanctioned, Group-2 UAS, solar power
03:01:00:00	2025-07-20	US, Stennis airport, Kiln, Mississippi	Skydweller	non FAI sactioned, solar powered. MTOW 2,000 kg (4,400 lb)
03:00:00:00	2025-08-15	US, Utah, Dugway	Dzyne Ultra	non FAI sanctioned, internal combustion
02:22:00:00	2019-12-11	US, Utah, Dugway	US AFRL LEAP	non FAI sanctioned, internal combustion
02:12:00:00	1988	US	Boeing Condor	non FAI sanctioned, 9.2 t, piston engines
02:11:00:00	2025-06-03	California	SoLong	non FAI sanctioned, solar battery
02:08:33:00	2021-06-21	Alddreu Airfield, Jeju, South Korea	KAU-SPUAV	non FAI sanctioned, solar power
02:07:56:00	2016-12-02	US, New Mexico, Las Cruces	Vanilla Aircraft VA001	U-1.c (50–500 kg), IC and Jet
02:06:27:00	2012-07-07	Latvia, Jelgava	UAV Factory Penguin B	non FAI sanctioned, 22.3 kg TOW, two-stroke
02:00:01:00	2013-04-18	unknown	US NRL Ion Tiger UAV	non FAI sanctioned, hydrogen fuel cell
02:00:00:00	2025-11-24	Abu Dhabi, UAE	UAVOS ApusNeo18	non FAI sanctioned, solar battery
01:10:24:00	2025	Grand Forks AFB, North Dakota	USAF Global Hawk	non FAI sanctioned
01:06:24:00	2001-03-21	US, California, Edwards	Northrop Grumman RQ-4	U-Absolute, U-2.g (10-20 t), IC and Jet
01:06:17:00	2022-02-19	unknown	Lockheed Martin Stalker	submitted to FAI, 5–25 kg, Propane Fuel Cell
01:03:30:00	2015-07-26	China	Phantom	Solar battery electric 17kg, 7.2m
01:02:01:00	2009-11-17	US, MD, Aberdeen	US NRL Ion Tiger UAV	non FAI sanctioned, 17 kg, hydrogen fuel cell

== Helicopter ==
=== Crewed, non-refueled ===
Duration (hhh:mm:ss)	Date	Location	Pilot	Aircraft	Comments	Reference
15:08:00	April 6, 1966	Culver City, California, US to Ormond Beach, Florida (2,213.04 mi)	Robert G. Ferry	Hughes YOH-6A	As a nonstop non-refueled trip this flight also holds the record for the longest distance flown in a helicopter without landing. FAI category: "Great circle distance, without landing".	

=== Uncrewed ===
Duration (hhh:mm:ss)	Date	Location	Pilot	Aircraft	Comments	Reference
32:08:00	October 2017	unknown	Uncrewed	Aerovel Flexrotor		
22:29:38	Aug 9–10, 2016	unknown	Uncrewed	Latitude HQ-60		
18:41:28	May 15, 2008	Yuma Proving Ground, Arizona, US	Uncrewed	Boeing A160 Hummingbird		

== Free balloon, crewed ==
Duration (dd:hh:mm:ss)	Date	Location	Pilot	Aircraft	Comments	Reference
19:21:47:00	March 1–21, 1999	Château-d'Œx, Switzerland; circumnavigation	Bertrand Piccard and Brian Jones	Breitling Orbiter 3		
14:19:50:00	June 19 – July 3, 2002	Northam, WA (Australia) circumnavigation	Steve Fossett	Cameron Balloons R-550 (N277SF)	Longest solo flight in any type of aircraft	
11:04:20:00	July 12–23, 2016	Northam, WA Australia; circumnavigation	Fedor Konyukhov	Cameron Balloons R-550	Shortest time around the world	
03:10:05:00	September 9–12, 1995	Wil, Switzerland to Lucincik, Ukraine (1.395,4 km)	Johann Fuerstner and Gerald Stuerzlinger	D-OSTZ Graf Zeppelin	3rd place in Gordon Bennett Gas Balloon Race	

== Airship ==
Duration (dd:hh:mm:ss)	Date	Location	Pilot	Aircraft	Comments	Reference
11:00:12:00	March 4 to March 15, 1957	Naval Air Station South Weymouth, Massachusetts, US to Naval Air Station Key West, Florida, US	Cmdr. Jack. R. Hunt	"Snowbird" ZPG-2	via Europe, Africa	
03:23:05:00	November 21 to November 25, 1917	Jambol, Bulgaria to Jambol, Bulgaria	LtCdr. Ludwig Bockholt	L95 (LZ104) Type W Zeppelin	Originally destined for the Makonde Plateau, mission aborted at 17° 30′ N, 30° 0′ E, near Khartoum, Sudan after areas fit for landing were captured by British forces	
02:23:00:00	October 29 to November 1, 1928	Lakehurst, New Jersey, US to Friedrichshafen, Germany	Hugo Eckener	LZ 127 Graf Zeppelin		

== Glider ==
Duration (dd:hh:mm:ss)	Date	Location	Pilot	Aircraft	Comments	Reference
02:23:05:00	July 28–30, 1961	Honolulu, Hawaii, US	Geza Vass and Guy Davis	Pratt-Read LNE-1		
02:08:15:00	April 2–4, 1952	Romanin les Alpilles near Saint-Rémy-de-Provence, France	Charles Atger	Arsenal Air 100		

== Space station, crewed ==
Duration that a specific person continuously occupies the spacecraft while in orbit.

Duration (ddd:hh:mm:ss)	Date	Location	Astronaut	Aircraft	Comments	Reference
437:17:58:17	January 8, 1994, to March 22, 1995	Low Earth orbit; Baikonur Cosmodrome to near Arkalyk, Kazakhstan	Valeri Polyakov	Russian space station Mir		

== Aerospacecraft, orbital, crewed ==
Duration (ddd:hh:mm:ss)	Date	Location	Astronaut	Aircraft	Comments	Reference
17:15:53:17	November 19 to December 7, 1996	Low Earth orbit, Kennedy Space Center	Kenneth D. Cockrell, Kent V. Rominger, Tamara E. Jernigan, Thomas D. Jones, and F. Story Musgrave	Space Shuttle Columbia, STS-80		

== See also ==
- Flight distance record
