= List of mayors of Meridian, Mississippi =

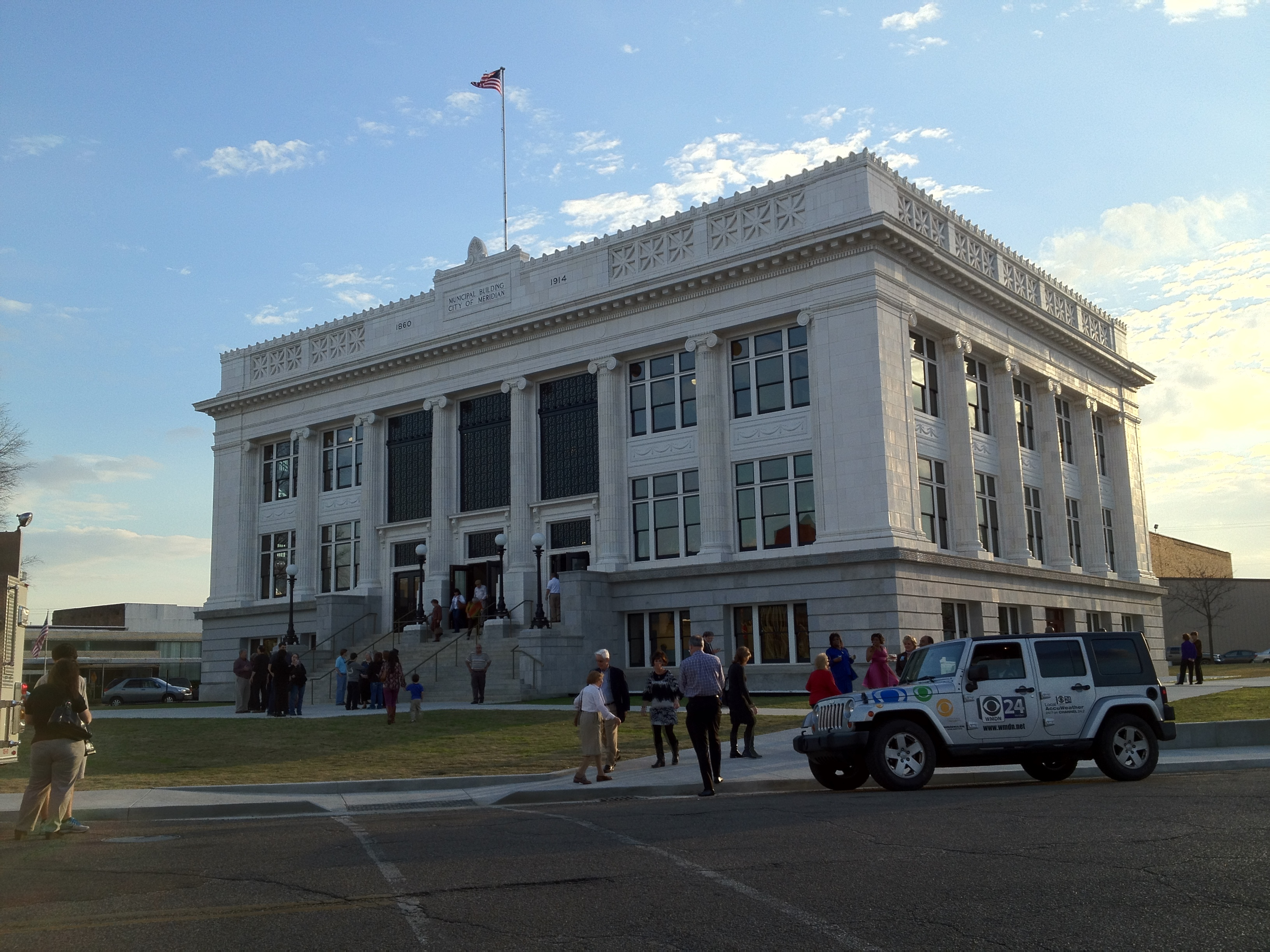
Meridian City Hall houses the mayor's office.

The mayor of Meridian, Mississippi is elected every four years by the population at large. Being the chief executive officer of the city, the mayor is responsible for administering and leading the day-to-day operations of city government. The current mayor of the city is Percy Bland, who was elected for a third non-consecutive term in 2025.

City Hall is located at 601 24th Avenue; the mayor's office is located on the second floor of the building.

== List of mayors ==
=== Nineteenth century ===
Mayor name	Term	Accomplishments
J. H. Gibbs	1859–1865	Gibbs was elected mayor in 1859 before the city was even incorporated. Upon incorporation in 1860, he was elected again and continued to serve as mayor until the end of the American Civil War in July 1865.
John Armstrong	1865–1866	In the decade after the Civil War, Meridian saw many mayoral changes; there were five different mayors in the year 1871 alone. William L. Sharkey, who had been appointed provisional governor of Mississippi after the war, appointed John Armstrong in July 1865. In December 1865 he was elected by the people and served for another year. R.L Henderson was elected in December 1866 and served until the following January, when the Radical Republicans gained control of Congress and the military appointed new state and local officials. William Cathey was named mayor and served until 1870. William Sturges succeeded Cathey and served until 1871. The Meridian race riot of 1871 occurred during his administration and resulted in the townspeople running him out of the city in March. John W. Smith was appointed by governor James L. Alcorn in March and served until September when he was replaced by Grafton Baker. Baker died in October 1871 and was replaced by B.T. Rush, who served until December when he was replaced by W.P. Evans, who served until 1873.
R.L Henderson	1866–1867	
William Cathey	1867–1870	
William Sturges	1870–Mar 1871	
John W. Smith	Mar–Sept 1871	
Grafton Baker	Sept–Oct 1871	
Benjamin T. Rush	Oct–Dec 1871	
W.P. Evans	1871–1873	
C. N. Wilcox	1873–1874	Wilcox was elected in January 1873 and was met by the Panic of 1873. Meridian's population dropped from 7000 to 3000, and property values dropped across the city.
E.V. Early	1874–1875	
W. W. Shearer	1875–1878	Shearer was elected in December 1874 (He took office in January 1875) and reelected in 1876, but he died in April 1878.
John Thomas Taylor	1878–1882	Taylor was elected to fill the remainder of Shearer's term and then reelected in December 1880 to a two-year term. He, too, died during his second term. During his administration, cotton production and shipping grew to become a substantial industry in the city.
Thomas H. Griffin	1882–1893	Griffin was elected in a special election of 1892 after Taylor's death and then reelected and served over 10 years as mayor. His administration ushered in the city's "Golden Age"; business and industry saw great expansion, and many famous businesses such as F.A. Hulett and Son Furniture and Loeb's were founded during this time.
Edwin H. Dial	1893–1901	During Dial's mayorship, the city installed updated infrastructure such as telephone lines, paved streets, and sidewalks. Both the original Union Station and the historic Grand Opera House were built during his tenure as well. Dial is also attributed with coining the city's nickname, "The Queen City." A marker was unveiled at the mayor's former residence on the corner of 30th Avenue and 10th Street in June 2009. The house was listed on the National Register of Historic Places in 1979 but was later demolished because of its dilapidated condition and replaced by a Habitat for Humanity house.

=== Twentieth century ===
Mayor name	Term	Accomplishments
Enoch Ephraim Spinks	1901–1903	Spinks continued most of Dial's policies. He oversaw the paving of more streets, and an extension of sewage and electric street railway systems. Before he was mayor, he was a local dentist and served 12 years on the Meridian Public School District Board of Directors and 8 years in the City Council.
James Henry Rivers	1903–1909	During Rivers's administration, the East End loop of the street car line was completed, and a committee that would eventually bring about the creation of Highland Park was established by the mayor. He also spoke out against employee neglect in the local cotton mills.
John Woods Parker	1909–1917	During Parker's first administration, six new school buildings were built, and the remainder were enlarged or improved. City streets were expanded from 3 miles (4.8 km) of total length to 15 miles (24 km), and sidewalks were doubled. Meridian City Hall was completed, along with two Carnegie libraries, a jail, and stables. The Meridian Fire Department was upgraded to have a fleet of vehicles instead of horse-drawn buggies as well.
John Milton Dabney	1917–1921	Dabney was mayor during World War I and served only one term. His former residence at 1017 22nd Avenue was listed on the National Register of Historic Places in 1979.
John Woods Parker	1921–1923	Parker, who had served previously from 1909 to 1917 was elected again in 1921 and served only half a term before his death in 1923.
William Henry Owen	1923–1933	Owen was elected in a special election after Parker's death. He had been councilman of the city's third ward from 1910 to 1913 and city commissioner from 1913 to 1920. The last four years of his administration were plagued by the Great Depression. Though he was well liked by his peers and the public, he was perceived by many as not being forceful enough to cope with the hard times brought about by the Depression, which lead to his defeat in the 1932 mayoral election.
Clint Vinson	1933–1945	
Frank L. Jacobs	1945–1949	
Laurence B. Paine	1949–1953	
William Smylie	1953–1957	Smylie brought the 22nd Avenue Bridge (also known as the James Melton Bridge) to downtown Meridian. This bridge circumvented twenty-six railroad tracks that passed through the center of the city, often stopping traffic on 22nd Avenue.
James C. Downey, Jr.	1957–1961	
Henry D. Burns	1961–1965	
Algene Key	1965–1973	Key, more widely known for breaking the world flight endurance record with his brother Fred in 1935, defeated incumbent Burns in the primaries and went on to win the election. During his administration he took an active role in civic affairs and had previously served as city and county director of civil defense.
Tom Stuart	1973–1977	Stuart was the city's first Republican mayor of the 20th century. In the 1973 election, he defeated Democratic incumbent Al Key by a landslide vote. As mayor he brought openness in government, street paving, and attempts to resolve downtown traffic problems.
Alfred Rosenbaum	1977–1985	Rosenbaum was the city's first Jewish mayor. Before he was mayor, he was instrumental in bringing Naval Air Station Meridian to the city. During his administration, the National Guard complex at Key Field was expanded, and Meridian developed a military presence unrivaled in East Mississippi.
Jimmy Kemp	1985–1993	Under Kemp's administration, the city developed nationally recognized recycling programs for household garbage and wastewater sludge. The city also adopted the Mississippi Main Street philosophy for downtown revitalization. A new public works complex, several city creek flood control projects, and the Bonita Lakes development program were put in place, and other infrastructure improvements were made. To aid in downtown traffic flow, 22nd and 23rd avenues were converted to one-way streets.

=== Twenty-first century ===
Mayor name	Term	Accomplishments
John Robert Smith	1993–2009	Smith oversaw many development and revitalization projects, particularly focused around downtown and inner-city neighborhoods. He helped renovate Union Station, promoted restoration of the historic Grand Opera House into the Riley Center, and spearheaded the development of a HOPE VI mixed-income housing project. As mayor, Smith was known as a strong supporter of the arts. He promoted downtown development, including the construction of a parking garage in the city's Arts District to support the Riley Center and other downtown arts venues. He also led the Meridian Green Initiative, a series of programs intended to support a healthy "green" environment for the city.
Cheri Barry	2009–2013	Barry was the city's first female mayor. Upon her election, Barry worked to cancel an agreement with the city and Historic Restoration Inc. (HRI) made during the previous administration to renovate the Threefoot Building into a downtown hotel. Barry, with a campaign motto of "Back to Basics", focused on the city's basic services, such as garbage collection, sewage treatment, and roads. The renovation of Meridian City Hall, begun under the Smith administration, was completed while Barry was in office, and a new police station was built as well, something Barry said was a "priority" for her administration.
Percy Bland	2013–2021	Bland won election on June 4, 2013, and took office on July 1. He was the city's first African-American mayor. Before he took office, Bland formed a 29-member transition team from the community to study five issues - education, community development, public safety, infrastructure, and city partnerships - and make recommendations about how to improve those areas in Meridian. Under Bland’s leadership, a proposed livable wage policy was passed, and new programs were launched to help fight crime in the city. The Parks and Recreation Department brought more mentors, coaches, and churches as partners for the City of Meridian to work with youth through athletics. In 2014, Bland built a team to bring a new airline carrier to Meridian. American Airlines the largest airline carrier in the world brought their service to Meridian under the name of American Eagle brand. During this time Bland began a mayor’s initiative to raise awareness of school attendance and the dangers of dropping out of school. He launched his Kids Zone Initiative, a program that partnered the City of Meridian with city and county schools, local and private to strengthen families. During his second term, Bland continued building and improving infrastructure in Meridian. He promoted businesses whose purpose was to improve the quality of life for all citizens, especially youth. His administration paved more than 28 miles of streets in the inner city during the last four years in office. He started the LED lighting initiative in which LED lights were installed in neighborhoods throughout the City of Meridian with a strong partnership with Mississippi Power. In April 2021, he helped purchase the Meridian Police Department Headquarters from a group of private investors with the city having a 41-year lease agreement. This reduced the re-payment on the building by 11 years and saved taxpayers $11 million. Bland helped engage the city and community to get buy-in on the MAX (Mississippi Arts and Entertainment Experience) and the Meridian Mississippi. Children’s Museum. He also worked with a developer to revitalize the Three-foot Building into a new state-of-the-art Marriott Hotel and Roof Top Bar and Restaurant that overlooks the city. New businesses began to open in downtown Meridian during his tenure.
Jimmie Smith	2021– 2025	Smith defeated incumbent Percy Bland in the Democratic runoff and won the June 8 mayoral election. 2nd African-American mayor.
Percy Bland	2025–present	Bland once again became mayor, this time for a third, though non-consecutive, term.
