= Cheri Barry =

American politician (died 2023)

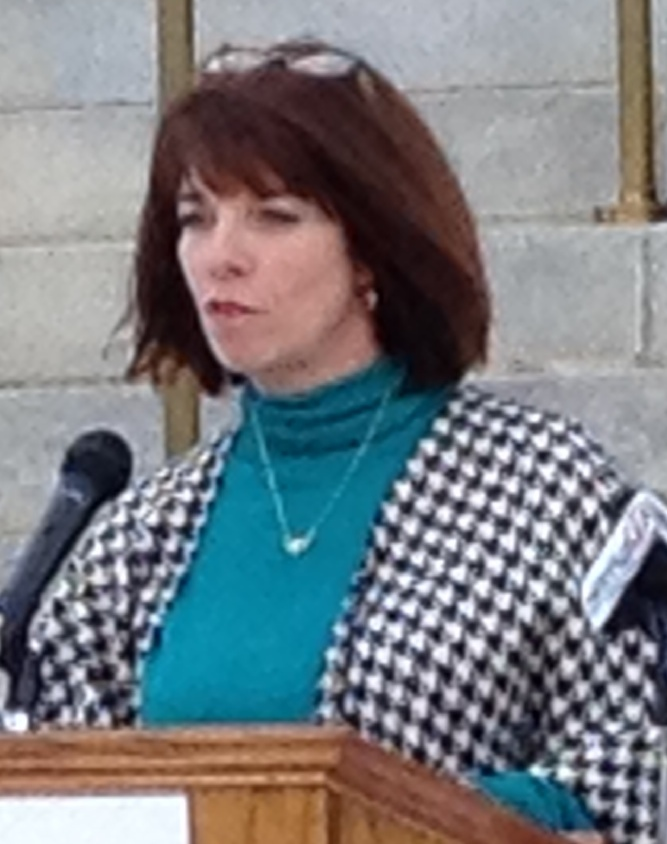
- Barry speaking in 2012

Mayor of Meridian, Mississippi
- In office July 1, 2009 – July 1, 2013
- Preceded by: John Robert Smith
- Succeeded by: Percy Bland

Personal details
- Born: Cheryl Merritt; April 19, 1955
- Died: December 24, 2023 (aged 68) Meridian, Mississippi, U.S.
- Party: Republican
- Spouse: Rick Barry
- Children: 3
- Profession: Executive Director of the American Red Cross Key Chapter

Cheryl Merritt Barry (April 19, 1955 – December 24, 2023) was an American politician who served as mayor of Meridian, Mississippi. She was the first woman to hold that position.

== Biography ==
The daughter of George and Jean Merritt, Cheri Merritt was born in 1955 and grew up in Meridian, where she was a graduate of Lamar High School in 1973. She continued her education at the University of Mississippi, where she graduated in 1977.

Shortly after graduation, she married Rick Barry, who is a County Attorney. They have three children, Jennifer Barry Fowler, Jay Barry and Merritt Barry.

Barry spent a good part of her professional career in public service. It began with the Lafayette County welfare system, where her focus was on children and geriatric abuse victims. She later worked with the Lauderdale County Welfare Department.

From 1998 to 2001, Barry taught in the Meridian Public Schools system. She then served as the Executive Director of the American Red Cross Key Chapter from 2001 until her election as mayor.

Barry narrowly defeated Democratic challenger Percy Bland to become the first female mayor of Meridian, Mississippi. She won by a margin of only 293 votes.

On Tuesday, July 7, 2009, shortly after her first City Council meeting, Barry vowed to make good on a campaign promise to have the community more involved in the governing process. "What I want to do is involve this community and give ownership back to the residents of Meridian," she said. "I want their input. I want their ideas."

The mayor receives a salary of $80,000 per year, which made her the fifth highest paid city employee in Meridian.

On June 4, 2013, Barry lost her bid for re-election to Percy Bland by a margin of 4,514 votes for Barry to 5,479 votes for Bland. Bland took office on July 1, 2013.

Barry died on December 24, 2023, at the age of 68.

== Municipal projects ==
=== Meridian Law Enforcement Center ===
On November 16, 2010, Mayor Barry and the Meridian City Council approved an order that authorized the execution of amendment to agreement for professional services between Watkins Development, LLC and the City of Meridian.

On June 7, 2011, Mayor Barry and other local officials held a ground-breaking ceremony for the Meridian Law Enforcement Center.

In June 2012, after a delay in construction, Mayor Barry announced the official approval to move forward with the Meridian Law Enforcement Center, and detailed the proposed financial structure for the city project.

Political offices
| Preceded by John Robert Smith | Mayor of Meridian, MS; July 1, 2009 – July 1, 2013 | Succeeded by Percy Bland |
