= Jimmie Smith (Mississippi politician) =

American politician

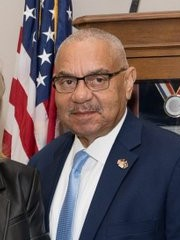

Mayor of Meridian, Mississippi
- In office July 1, 2021 – June 30, 2025
- Preceded by: Percy Bland
- Succeeded by: Percy Bland

Personal details
- Born: Chicago, Illinois, U.S.
- Party: Democratic

Jimmie Smith is an American politician and member of the Democratic Party served as the mayor of Meridian, Mississippi from 2021 to 2025. Previously, he served 20 years on the Lauderdale County Board of Supervisors.

== Early life ==
Smith was born in Chicago. As a teenager, he moved to Meridian.

== Career ==
Shortly after his arrival in Meridian, Smith worked in area hospitals. Later, he joined the Meridian Police Department where he worked in various divisions including the SWAT Team.

Smith served for 20 years on the Lauderdale County Board of Supervisors.

== Mayor of Meridian ==
In 2005, while still serving on the Board of Supervisors, Smith was the Democratic nominee for mayor. He lost to the incumbent John Robert Smith in the general election by only 104 votes.

Sixteen years later, Jimmie Smith faced off against Mayor Percy Bland in the Democratic primary. After, beating Bland in the April 2021 run-off, he faced city council member Weston Lindemann, an independent, and Republican Robert Ray in the general election. In June 2021, Smith won that race decisively with over 60 percent of the vote.

In the April 2025 primary, however, Smith would again face Bland in his bid for a second term as mayor of Meridian. This time around, however, Bland managed to defeat Smith after securing 67% of the primary vote.

Political offices
Preceded by Percy Bland	Mayor of Meridian, Mississippi; July 1, 2021 –	Succeeded by Incumbent
