= Resolute Eagle =

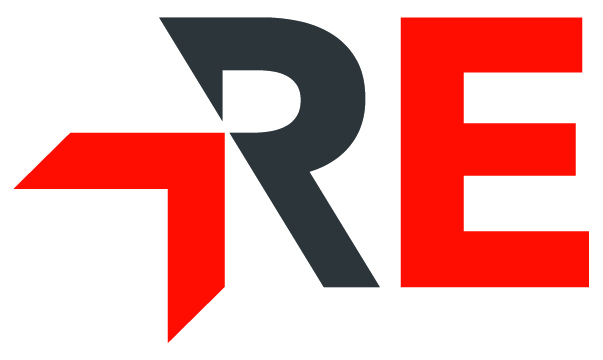

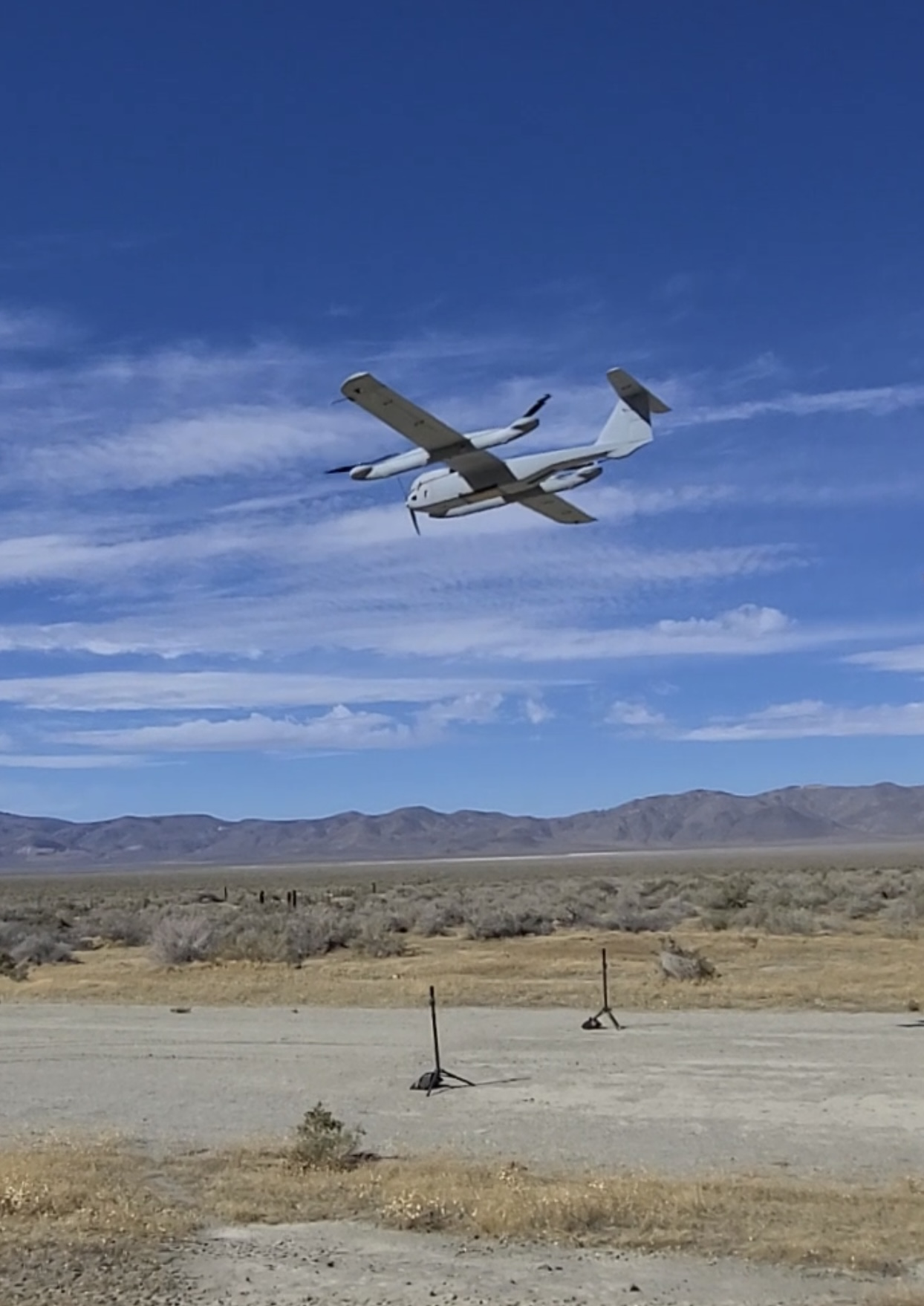
Resolute Eagle VTOL Operations

Resolute Eagle is a long-endurance Group 3 unmanned aircraft system (UAS) manufactured and operated by Resolute ISR, Inc. in Howell MI. Resolute Eagle is equipped with a 33 hp multi-fuel engine manufactured by XRDi.

The Resolute Eagle is one platform, two configurations. Configuration can be changed in less than 30 minutes.

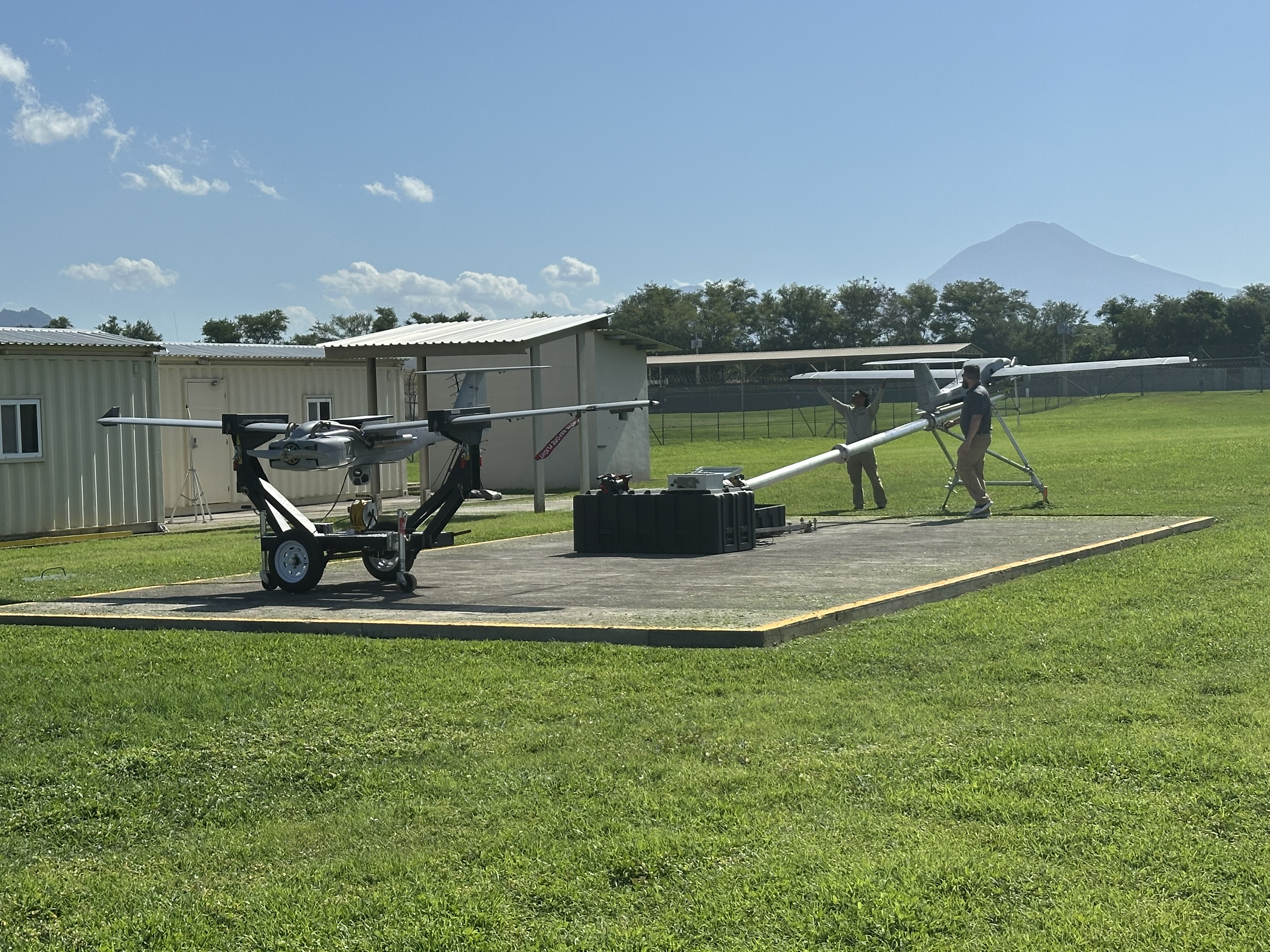
Two Resolute Eagle Standard Configuration aircraft preparing to launch.

The Standard Fixed Wing configuration launches on a low-pressure Pneumatic launcher and recovers via a Belly-skid landing utilizing a Kevlar skid plate. The Resolute Eagle Hybrid VTOL features two battery-powered booms with four propellers. Resolute Eagle uses an Applied Navigation Quattro autopilot with Vigilant Spirt..

In August 2020, AATI sold the Resolute Eagle UAS Intellectual Property (IP) and assets to Resolute ISR, Inc. Resolute Eagle is equipped with a 33 hp multi-fuel engine manufactured by XRDi. XRDi and Resolute ISR are wholly owned by the Heligroup, Inc.

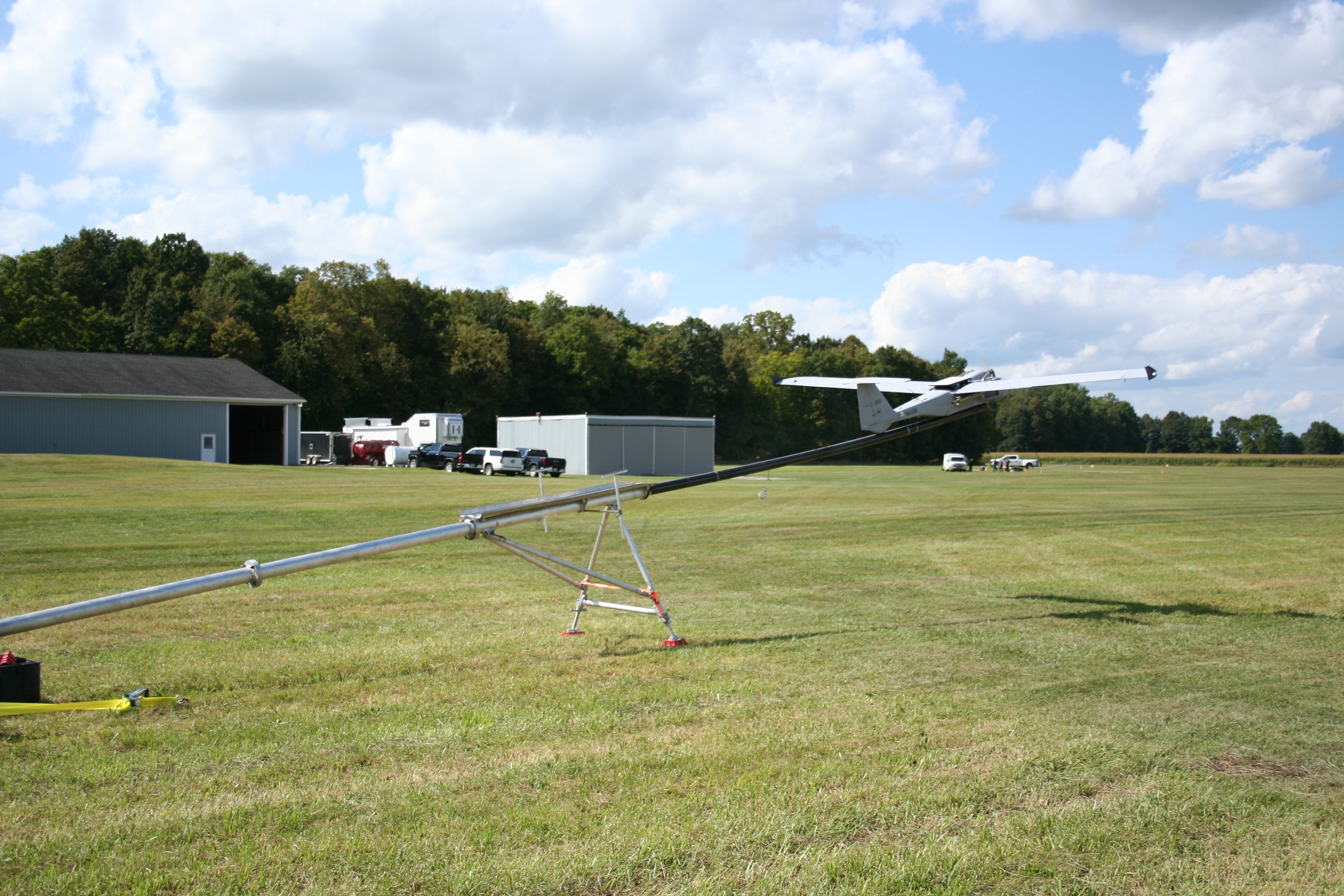
RE400 PTOL Launch Sept 2025

In April to May of 2025 (April 1 to May 27), Resolute Eagle participated in the annual U.S. Naval Forces Southern Command / U.S. 4th Fleet Hybrid Fleet Campaign (HFC) Fleet Experimentation (FLEX) in San Salvador, El Salvador.

== Payloads ==
Resolute Eagle is designed with Modular Open Systems Architecture (MOSA) principals and is a long-endurance, multi-intelligence platform.

Current payloads include the Trillium HD-80/95 cameras, IMSAR NSP (3,5 and 7), Arkeus HSOR, Silvus StreamCaster SC4200-SC4400 MN-MIMO Radio, Bandit 2x, PLEO SATCOM communication links, and MPU5 mobile ad hoc network (MANET) radios.

| Wingspan | 18.2 ft |
| Length | 9.5 ft |
| Service Ceiling | 21,000 ft |
| Endurance | 12-18+ h |
| Speed (dash/cruise) | 125 kn/55 kn |
| Engine Power | RE-400 Liquid Cooled Multi-Fuel 33.4 hp |
| Maximum Takeoff Weight | 300 lb |
| Empty Weight | 155 lb |
| Usable Payload Weight | 145 lb |
| Onboard Power | 3,000 Watts |
| Payload Bays | Fuselage and underwing bays |
| Communications | PLEO (Starshield/Starlink) |
Sources: www.resoluteisr.com

== Other hybrid VTOL UAS ==
- Textron Systems Aerosonde HQ SUAS
- IAI/Hankuk Carbon Panther FE
- Arcturus JUMP-20
- KWT-350 VTOL Fixed-wing UAV
