= Percy Bland =

American politician (born 1970)

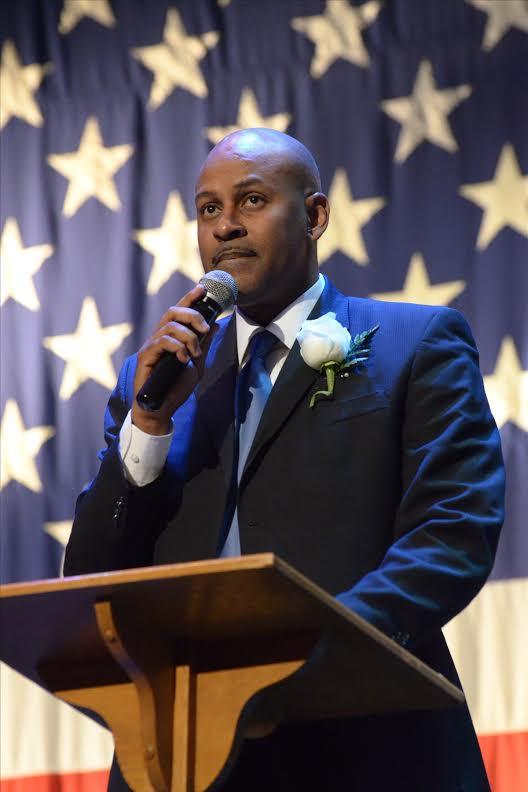
- Bland at the Meridian Temple Theater, 2013

Mayor of Meridian, Mississippi
- Incumbent
- Assumed office June 30, 2025
- Preceded by: Jimmie Smith
- In office July 1, 2013 – July 1, 2021
- Preceded by: Cheri Merritt Barry
- Succeeded by: Jimmie Smith

Personal details
- Born: September 23, 1970 (age 56) Crystal Springs, Mississippi, U.S.
- Party: Democratic
- Spouse: Deidre Bland (m. 1999)
- Education: Xavier University of Louisiana (B.S.); University of Southern Mississippi (M.P.H.)
- Profession: State Farm Insurance Agent
- Website: Official Website

Percy Bland (born September 23, 1970) is an American politician and member of the Democratic Party, who is currently the mayor of Meridian, Mississippi. He was re-elected in June 2025, having previously served as mayor from 2013 to 2021. Bland made history as Meridian’s first African American mayor and is widely recognized for his role in the revitalization of Downtown Meridian.

Under Bland's leadership, the Threefoot Hotel became a reality, the Highway 59/20 lighting project was completed which was funded and supported by the State of Mississippi, downtown businesses like Castle Pipeline established their new corporate headquarters in downtown Meridian and because of the Go Cup Ordinance, more restaurants like the Three-foot Brewery were established.

== Early life and family ==
Percy Bland was born in Crystal Springs, Mississippi on September 23, 1970. Bland grew up in Jackson, Mississippi and attended St. Joseph High School, Bland later earned a B.S. in chemistry at Xavier University of Louisiana of New Orleans, and played collegiate basketball. Bland also earned a Master's of Public Health (MPH) degree at the University of Southern Mississippi.

Bland met his wife Deidre in Atlanta and the couple was married on August 15, 1999. They have two children. Deidre currently sells real estate in Mississippi and Alabama.

== Career ==
Bland went on to work for the Fulton County Health Department in Atlanta, Georgia, where he served as an epidemiologist in the Tuberculosis Control Department. Bland returned to Mississippi and began employment as the Human Resources Director and Marketing Director with the G.A. Carmichael Family Health Center. Bland came to Meridian to own and operate a State Farm Insurance Agency. Bland continues to run and manage an insurance agency, selling property, casualty and life insurance in Mississippi and Alabama.

== Community involvement ==
In 2007, Bland served as co-chair to pass a bond issue for the first major renovations and improvements to Meridian's public schools in more than 20 years. The bond issue was for $19.5 million. The bond issue passed on March 27, 2007, with 71.3%.

Bland also helped establish the Magnolia Youth Sports Association. Bland helped establish the First Tee Golf Program in Meridian, the first in the state, a golf program aimed at improving the quality of life of primarily inner-city children.

== Mayor of Meridian ==
On June 4, 2013, Percy Bland won the election for mayor of Meridian by 54% of the vote. Before he took office, Bland formed a 29-member transition team from the community to study five issues - education, community development, public safety, infrastructure and city partnerships - and make recommendations about how to more improve those areas in Meridian. Bland was sworn in as the first African-American mayor of the city of Meridian on July 1, 2013.

During the first Meridian City Council meeting of the new administration, on July 2, 2014, Bland proposed his livable wage policy. Bland proposed a $9 an hour minimum salary for all city employees that was to be funded by money saved through cuts to other areas of the municipal budget. Bland's livable wage proposal became city policy when the city council passed the municipal budget on September 17, 2013.

Bland and several local businesses began recognizing an outstanding teacher or staff member from two MPSD schools a month during the 2013–14 school year. Improvements to public safety were made to the newly annexed part of Meridian through a new warning siren at the recently constructed fire station in that area. Meridian youth sports were brought together through one comprehensive program in the Meridian Parks and Recreation Department. The program brought in more mentors, more coaches, and more churches as partners for the City of Meridian to work with youth through athletics. In May 2014, the City of Meridian pledged $750,000 to help build a new community center.

In May 2014, the City of Meridian launched a series of new programs to help fight crime in the city, including a new gang task force, a new team of Meridian police officers and citizens to help with tips on crime, and penalizing parents when their children do not comply with the Mississippi Compulsory School Attendance Law.

In June 2014, Bland built a team to bring a new airline carrier to Meridian. American Airlines the largest airline carrier in the world brings their service to Meridian under the American Eagle brand. Express Jet will operate the service for American Airlines.

In September 2014, Bland began a mayor's initiative to raise awareness of school attendance and the dangers of dropping out of high school. Through his Mayor's Youth Council, Bland created a public service announcement that emphasized issues that high school students face, such as bullying, drugs, and depression.

In October 2014, Bland launched his Kidz Zone Initiative, a program that partnered the City of Meridian with city and county schools, both local and private, to strengthen families. On the second Saturday of each month Disney movies are shown at the Meridian Temple Theatre for $2. The program encourages fathers to play an active role within their children's lives. All fathers are allowed free admission to the movie. Also in October 2014, Bland started a "Senior Prom" initiative to engage senior citizens and provide more community activities for that population.

On October 6, 2014, Bland received a letter from Governor Phil Bryant that stated Meridian has been approved for a $600,000 Community Development Block Grant to help fund a new community center in the city's east end that would accommodate up to 400 children.

On January 26, 2015, Bland and Choctaw Tribal Chief Phyliss J. Anderson signed an agreement to restore public transportation in Meridian. The Choctaw Regional Transportation Facility operates in more than a dozen counties in Mississippi. The bus that will be used in Meridian is handicap accessible, and can seat up to 29 people. People will have to call a special number to make arrangements to be picked up and dropped off at sites.

On September 2, 2015, Bland, in cooperation with Commissioner Dick Hall, of Mississippi Department of Transportation, and Meridian Public Schools officials, opened a federally funded Safe Routes to Schools bridge at TJ Harris Lower Elementary School.

On February 2, 2016, city officials unanimously approved a resolution that authorized and directed the issuance of general obligation bonds for $7.5 million. The bonds will provide funds for the construction, improvement, and paving of streets, sidewalks, driveways, parkways, walkways, bridges and culverts, public parking facilities, and other municipal projects.

On May 18, 2016, Meridian city officials, along with community members and leaders, held a groundbreaking ceremony for Velma Young Community Center. The $2 million project is the first project that brought together the City of Meridian, Lauderdale County, Meridian Housing Authority, and East Mississippi Development for a predominately African-American project. "This has been an under-served area for a number of years, and this community center right here is going to be a huge shot in the arm for this community," said Mayor Percy Bland.

On July 5, 2016, Mayor Bland and the Meridian City Council passed a resolution and ordinance setting a date of August 16, 2016 for a referendum of a two percent (2%) food and beverage levy at restaurants within the city of Meridian. Revenue from the levy will fund the construction, equipment, furnishings, and operation of the Mississippi Arts and Entertainment Center. The referendum passed with 68.2 percent.

On June 6, 2017, Mayor Bland won a second term against two opponents, Independent Dustin Markham and Republican William Compton. Mayor Bland received 64 percent of the vote, Markham received 34 percent, and Compton received 2 percent.

=== Second term ===
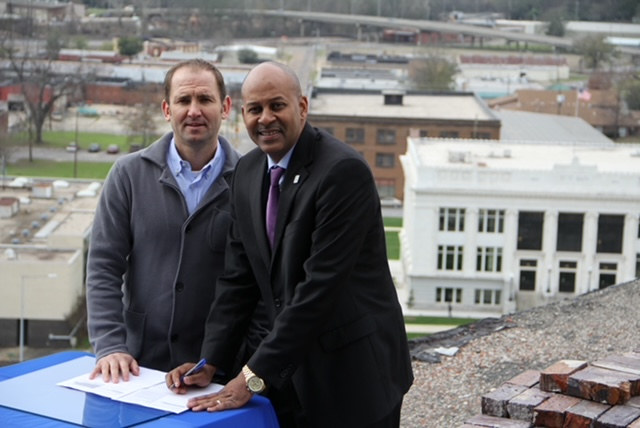
Percy Bland with John Tampa, developer of Threefoot Marriot Hotel

Bland continued building and improving infrastructure in Meridian during his second term as Mayor. He promoted businesses whose purpose was to improve the quality of life for all citizens especially youth. His administration paved more than 28 miles of streets in the inner city during the last four years in office. He started a LED lighting initiative in which LED lightings were installed in neighborhoods throughout the City of Meridian beginning in 2015 with a strong partnership with Mississippi Power. Through his Parks and Recreation Program, Bland grew sports activities offered to all children from 30 to more than 55. He installed new playground equipment at Velma Young Center, James Chaney Park, Bonita Lakes and opened a Splash Pad at Highland Park.

In November 2018, during the aftermath of an F-2 tornado in Ward 2, he championed the Partner's in Recovery Response Team response and helped recover faster.

In October 2019, his administration renamed part of downtown 8th Street to David Ruffin Blvd and brought in JSU's Sonic Boom to highlight the occasion along with a dozen of Ruffin's family members.

In November 2019, Bland created a family and kid-friendly environment that helped to bring new businesses to Meridian like Hype, Event Zone, and an updated family-oriented Movie Theater with a strong partnership with Developer Andy Weiner.

In December 2019, under the Bland administration, the Go Cup or Open Container ordinance for restaurants downtown Meridian went into effect.

In 2020, he pushed the $12.5 million paving bond to pave streets in the inner city.

In March 2021, he worked with Mississippi Transportation Commissioner Willie Simmons to make improvements to Interstate 59/20 in Meridian.

In April 2021, he helped purchase the Meridian Police Department Headquarters from a group of private investors that the city had a 41-year lease agreement with. This reduced the re-payment on the building by 11 years and saved taxpayers $11 million.

During his administration, guidelines were issued to residents and business owners to follow safety precautions during the first year and six months of a national pandemic caused by the COVID-19. Thus, protected the lives of many citizens during an unprecedented national and local crisis. He helped engage the city council and community and helped to get buy-in on the MAX (Mississippi Arts and Entertainment Experience) and the Meridian Mississippi Children's Museum. He also worked with a developer, John Tampa, during his time in office to revitalize the Three-foot Building into a new state of the arts Marriott Hotel and Roof Top Bar and Restaurant that overlooks the city. New businesses opened in downtown Meridian such as Castle Headquarters (formerly Progressive Pipeline), Three-foot Brewery, and near Bonita Lakes Mall, a new Starbucks Coffee Shop during his tenure.

Percy Bland lost to Democratic Candidate Jimmie Smith in the April 2021 primary. Throughout the primary, Smith refused to publicly debate Bland on issues-running instead on a slogan "We Can Do Better" without ever having to disclose what better would be. Smith's campaign manager was a well-known Mississippi Republican and he was endorsed early on in the campaign by former Republican Meridian Mayor Jimmy Kemp. Democratic candidate Smith won the general election in June 2021 with the huge backing of Republican voters.

=== 2025 re-election campaign and third term ===
On April 1, 2025, Bland would win again face Jimmie Smith in the April 2025 primary for Mayor of Meridian, this time managing to defeat Smith and secure the Democratic nomination in the first round after winning 67% of the vote. Bland would face Independent challenger Jimmy Copeland in the June 3, 2025 general election. He managed to once again be elected mayor after narrowly defeating Copeland in the general election. This will be Bland's third term as mayor of Meridian. On June 30, 2025, Bland would officially return to office after being sworn in for a third term.

== See also ==
- List of first African-American mayors

== Gallery ==
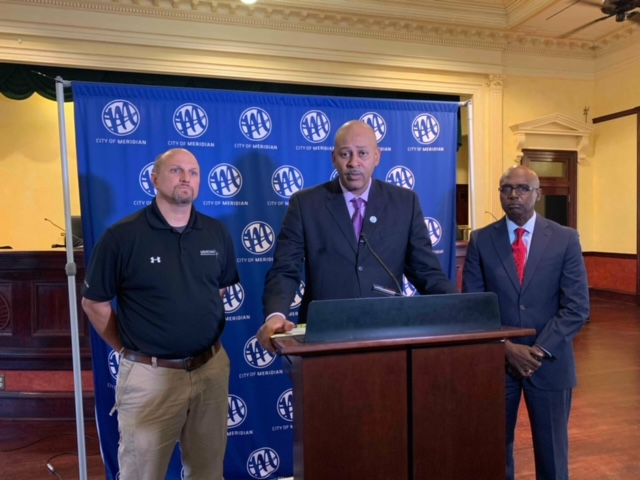

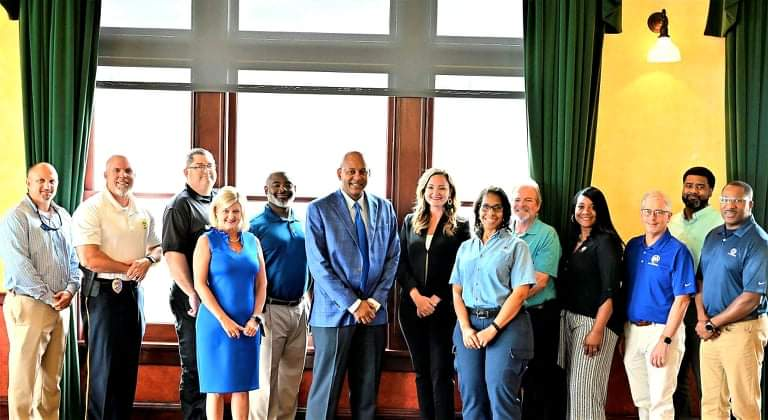

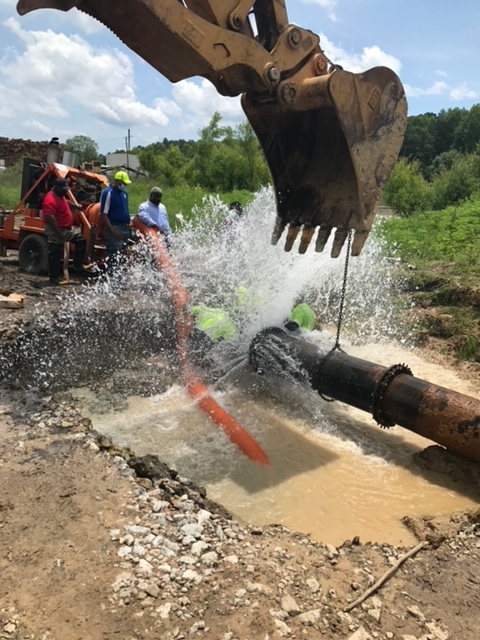

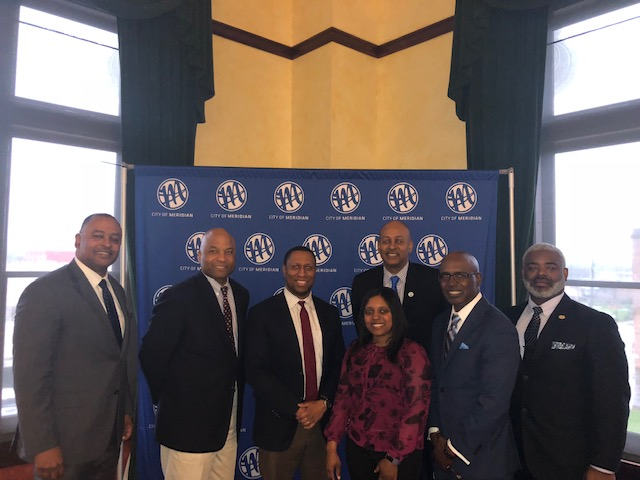

Political offices
Preceded by Cheri Barry	Mayor of Meridian, Mississippi; July 1, 2013 – July 1, 2021	Succeeded by Jimmie Smith
