= Lamar School (Meridian, Mississippi) =

Segregation academy in Meridian, Mississippi

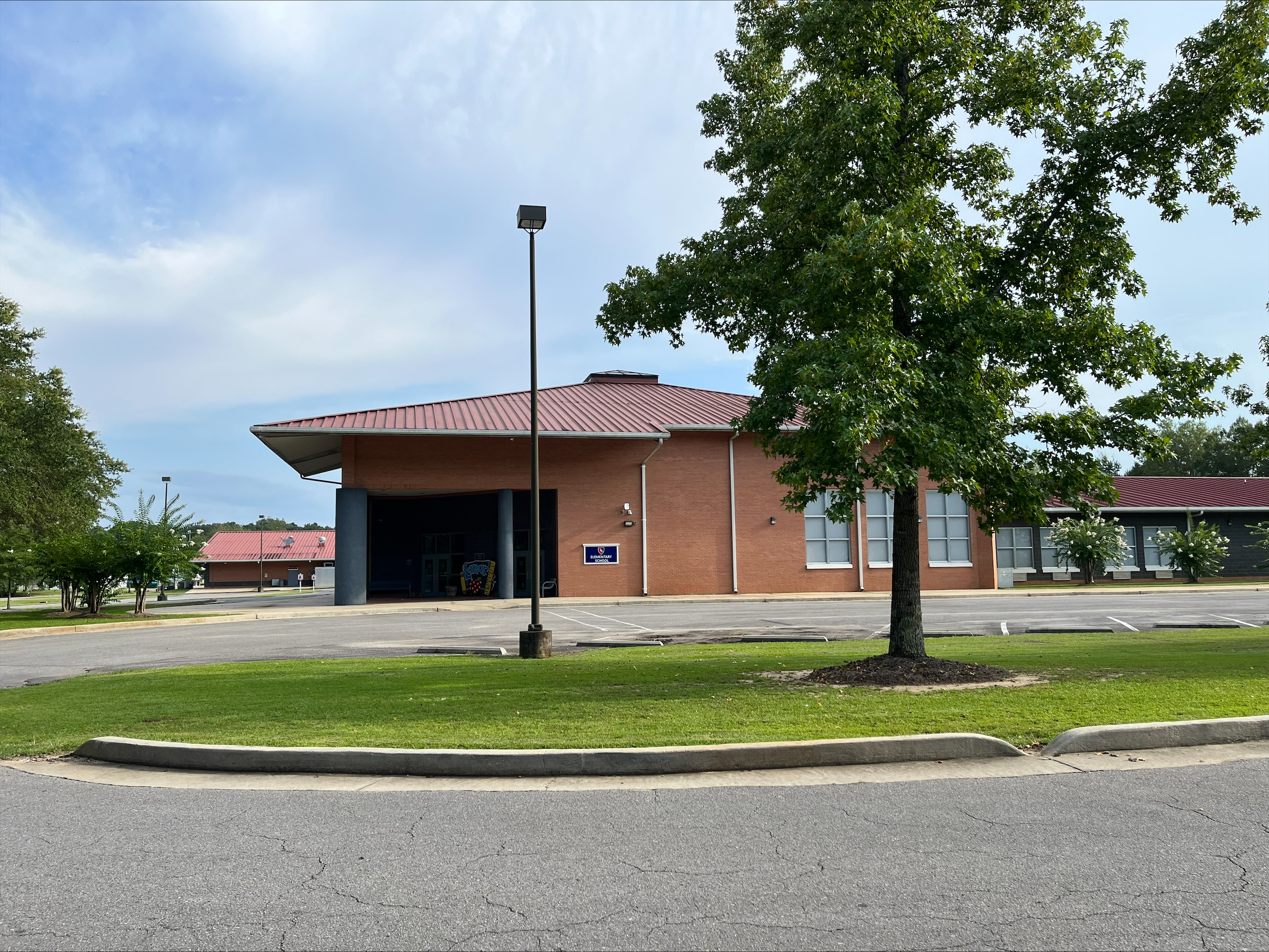

Location
- 544 Lindley Road; Meridian, Mississippi; 32°24′48″N 88°39′57″W

Information
- Type: Private
- Motto: Truth, Knowledge, Honor
- Established: 1964
- Headmaster: Leigh Ann Ballou
- Grades: K-12
- Enrollment: 653
- Student to teacher ratio: 15:1
- Campus: Suburban
- Colors: Red, White, Navy
- Mascot: Raider
- Website: Lamar School

Lamar School, is an independent coeducational school located in Meridian, Mississippi, United States founded in 1964 as a segregation academy. It consists of elementary, middle, and high school and serves grades Pre-K through 12th.

== History ==
Chartered in 1964, Lamar Elementary opened with grades one through six in 1965. Lamar Middle/High School opened in 1970. The school's name memorializes Confederate politician, enslaver, and white supremacist Lucius Quintus Cincinnatus Lamar. The school was established in 1964 as a segregation academy. It was founded as a whites-only establishment, which led to the denial of its tax exemptions, a decision upheld by the United States Supreme Court in 1971.

For the 1965-1966 school year, 49% of the school's tuition revenue came from grants provided by Mississippi. In 1969, a federal court ruled that, since, in the court's opinion, the Lamar School would refuse to admit qualified black students, the tuition grant program violated the equal protection clause of the fourteenth amendment. The Internal Revenue Service revoked the school's tax exemption after it declined to document that it had a racially nondiscriminatory admissions policy.

In 1981, the school enrolled its first black student, the daughter of the Nigerian Finance Minister.

== Student body ==
In the 2015-16 school year, the student body (grades 1-12) of 541 had 21 black students (4%). Data available for the 2017-2018 school year reflects growing diversity. From a student body of 587 students (grades 1-12), 71 students (12%) identified as a member of a minority group, Minorities are still severely underrepresented, as the community is 66% minority, including 63% black.

For the 2019-2020 school year, Lamar students elected a black pupil as Student Council President. However, the campus administration, board, and faculty remain almost exclusively white.

== Notable alumnae ==
- Sela Ward, film and television actress.
- Cheri Barry, first woman Mayor of Meridian
