= Al Key =

American aviator and politician

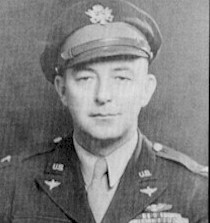
- Al Key in military uniform, ca. 1940

Mayor of Meridian, Mississippi
- In office July 1, 1965 – July 1, 1973
- Preceded by: Henry D. Burns
- Succeeded by: Tom Stuart

Personal details
- Born: Algene Earl Key; February 5, 1905 Kemper County, Mississippi, U.S.
- Died: July 17, 1976 (aged 71) Meridian, Mississippi, U.S.
- Party: Democratic
- Spouse: Evelyn N. Rogers (m. 1925)
- Children: One
- Education: Hattiesburg Normal School (now University of Southern Mississippi); Mississippi A & M College (now Mississippi State University)

Al Key (5 February 1905 – 17 July 1976) was an American aviator who broke a flight endurance record with his brother Fred in 1935.

After a distinguished career in the military, he served as the mayor of Meridian, Mississippi from 1965 to 1973.

== Early life and family ==
Algene Earl Key was born on a farm in Kemper County, Mississippi on February 5, 1905. He was the eldest of three sons of Elmore Benjamin (1877-1951), a physician, and Mary Ola Love (Olivier) Key (1879-1970), a homemaker. In the 1920s, Al moved with his family to Meridian.

Al attended Hattiesburg Normal School (later the University of Southern Mississippi) and Mississippi A & M College (later Mississippi State University).

== Career ==
In 1926, Key began taking flying lessons at the Nicholas Beazley Flying School in Marshall, Missouri. After obtaining his pilot's license, he sparked his brother Fred's interest in flying. He and his brother Fred started their own flying school in Sedalia, Missouri.

Returning to Meridian in 1930, Al became the city's first licensed pilot. He and Fred started a flying school based at the old Bonita Airport in Meridian.

In 1935, Al and Fred broke an aviation endurance record when they flew a single engine plane 653 hours and 34 minutes. It was their third attempt. In recognition of their achievement the Meridian airport was named Key Field in their honor.

Thirty years later, it was still the official endurance record. However, by that time at least two flights were claimed to be of longer duration.

== Military service ==
In 1939, Key formed one of the first Air National Guard units in the United States. Immediately after America entered World War Two, it was also one of the first units called to active duty.

In the early days of the U.S. involvement in World War Two, Key served with distinction as a bomber pilot. One of his many honors was receiving the distinguished service cross in 1943 for flying his severely damaged plane during a raid in France, which was then under the control of Nazi Germany.

Key retired from the military in 1960. At the time of his retirement, he served as deputy commander of Headquarters Continental Airways and Air Communications Service Area located at Tinker Air Force Base, Oklahoma.

== Mayor of Meridian ==
Key served two terms as mayor of Meridian from 1965 to 1973.

== Death ==
On Saturday, July 3, 1976, just one day before the Bicentennial, Key was involved in an automobile accident. He died two weeks later at Rush Foundation Hospital in Meridian as a result of his injuries.

== See also ==
- History of aviation
- List of firsts in aviation
- Timeline of aviation

Political offices
Preceded by Henry D. Burns	Mayor of Meridian, Mississippi; July 1, 1965 – July 1, 1973	Succeeded by Tom Stuart
