= John Robert Smith =

American politician

Mayor of Meridian, Mississippi
- In office July 1, 1993 – July 1, 2009
- Preceded by: Jimmy Kemp
- Succeeded by: Cheri Barry

Personal details
- Party: Republican

John Robert Smith served four terms as mayor of Meridian, Mississippi and formerly serves as the president and CEO of Reconnecting America, a national non-profit transit research and advocacy think-tank. Senior policy adviser at Smart Growth America and chairman of Transportation for America.

== Career ==
John Robert Smith was elected Mayor of Meridian in 1993 and was re-elected three times. In 2005, while seeking a fourth term, he narrowly defeated Lauderdale County Supervisor Jimmie Smith, a Democrat, by only 104 votes in the general election. He decided not to run for a fifth term.

== Recognition ==
In 2002, Smith was elected as Chairman of the Board of the Amtrak Board of Directors. He had served on the board since June 1998.

As mayor, Smith was known as a strong supporter of the arts. In 2005, he won a Public Leadership in the Arts Award from Americans for the Arts.

In 2009 he was named Reconnecting America's president and CEO.

Political offices
Preceded by Jimmy Kemp	Mayor of Meridian, MS; 1993–2009	Succeeded by Cheri Barry
