= Meridian High School (Mississippi) =

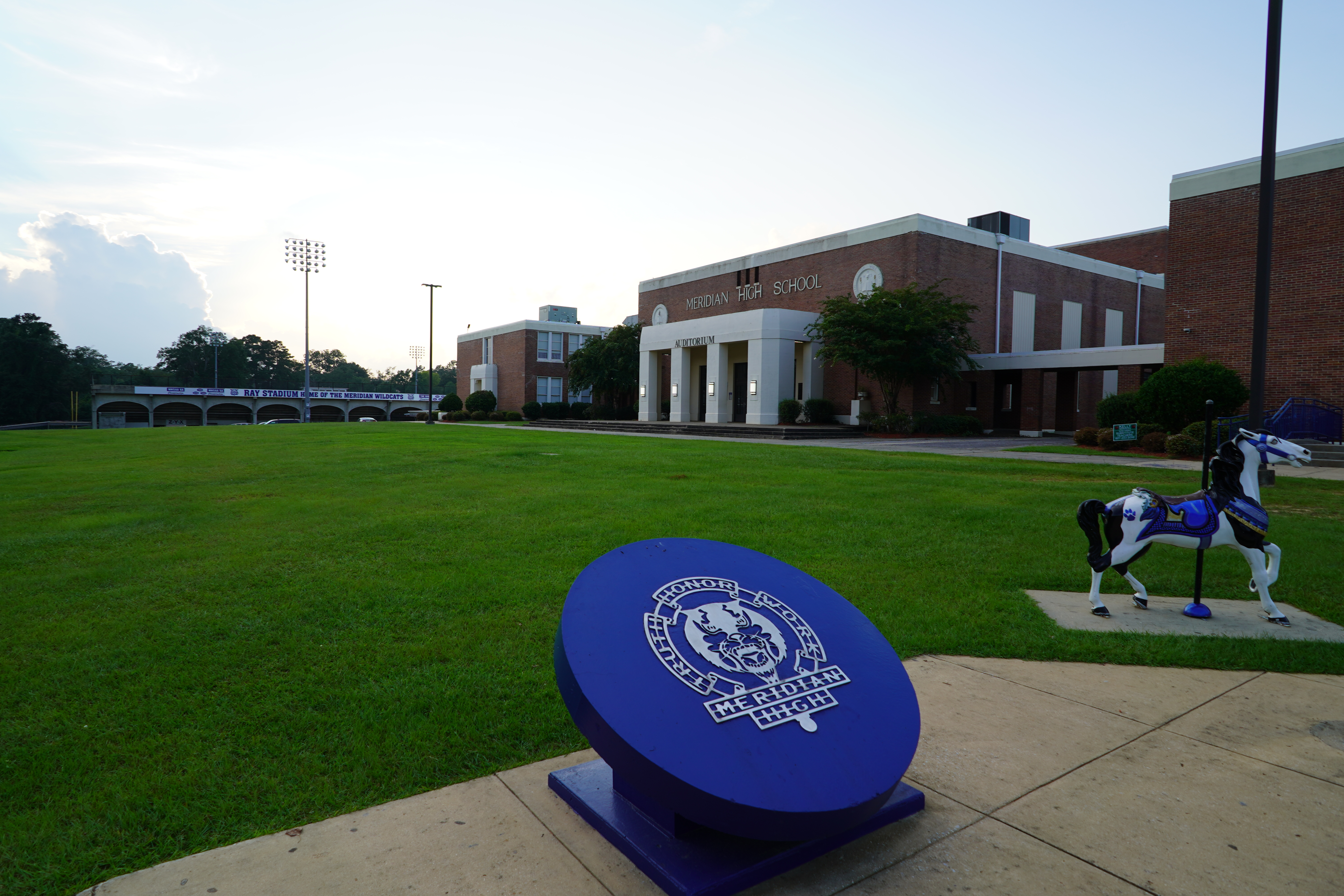

Location
- 2320 32nd Street; Meridian, Mississippi 39305; United States

Information
- Type: Public
- Founded: 1886
- School district: Meridian Public School District
- Principal: Victor Hubbard (2010–2020); Joe Griffin (2020–2021); Angela McQuarley (2021–2025); Sherrod Miller, M.Ed.(2025–Present)
- Teaching staff: 96.04 (FTE)
- Grades: 9–12
- Enrollment: 1,314 (2023-2024)
- Student to teacher ratio: 13.68
- Colors: Blue and white
- Mascot: Wildcats
- Website: www.mpsdk12.net/our-schools/meridian-high-school

Meridian High School is a public high school in Meridian, Mississippi. It is within the Meridian Public School District.

As of 2020 its enrollment is about 1,700.

== History ==
It was established in 1886.

It was named a 1984-1985 National Blue Ribbon School.

Meridian Senior High School and Junior College was listed in the National Register of Historic Places on May 29, 2014.

== Notable alumni ==
- Thomas W. Moore (1936) ABC TV Network, director of programing 1958–1962, network president 1962–1969.
- Howard W. Gilmore (1919) U.S. Navy Medal of Honor in 1943
- Diane Ladd (Diane Ladner) (1952) Actress, producer, director, and author.
- Tom Stuart (1955), mayor of Meridian, Mississippi from 1973 to 1977.
- Paul Davis (1966) Singer, songwriter.
- John Fleming (1969), Republican Representative of Louisiana's 4th congressional district from 2009 to 2017.
- Oil Can Boyd (1977) MLB Pitcher
- Charles Young Jr. (1980) Mississippi House of Representatives
- Susan Akin (1982) Miss America in 1986
- Derrick McKey (1984) NBA player
- Dexter McCleon (1992) former NFL defensive back, St. Louis Rams, Super Bowl champion
- Joni Taylor (1997) head women's basketball coach for the Texas A&M Aggies women's basketball team, formerly for the Georgia Lady Bulldogs
- Kenyatta Walker (1997), offensive tackle for the Tampa Bay Buccaneers
- Big K.R.I.T. (2004) rapper and record producer
- Tyler Russell (2009) former American football quarterback
- Rodney Hood (2011) NBA player
- J'Mar Smith (2015) football player
- Raekwon Davis (2016) NFL defensive tackle for the Miami Dolphins
- Daniel Hill (2024), college football running back for the Alabama Crimson Tide

== See also ==
- National Register of Historic Places listings in Lauderdale County, Mississippi
