= Tom Stuart (politician) =

American politician

Mayor of Meridian, Mississippi
- In office 1973–1977
- Preceded by: Al Key
- Succeeded by: Alfred Rosenbaum

Personal details
- Born: James Thomas Stuart, Jr. November 19, 1936 Pensacola, Florida
- Died: November 16, 2001 (aged 64) Philadelphia, Mississippi, U.S.
- Party: Republican
- Children: Betsy Stuart Allen
- Education: Meridian High School; Meridian Junior College; Florida Institute of Technology

Tom Stuart (November 19, 1936 – November 16, 2001) was an American politician who served as the first Republican mayor of Meridian, the county seat of Lauderdale County in eastern Mississippi. He was a pioneer in the development of the two-party system in Mississippi.

== Early life ==
Tom Stuart was born James Thomas Stuart, Jr. in Pensacola, Florida to Joyce. A Stuart and James Thomas Stuart. He attended Meridian High School and was a member of the French club, chess club, and basketball team.

| Preceded by Al Key | Mayor of Meridian, Mississippi; 1973–1977 | Succeeded by Alfred Rosenbaum |
