= Meridian Public School District =

School district in Mississippi

Coordinates: 32.367608°N 88.703940°W

The Meridian Public School District is a public school district based in Meridian, Mississippi (USA). Its service area is the same as the city limits of Meridian.

== Schools ==
High schools

- Meridian High School
  - 1984-1985 National Blue Ribbon School
- Ross Collins Career and Technical Center

Junior high schools

- Kate Griffin Junior High School
  - 1986-1987 National Blue Ribbon School
- Northwest Junior High School

Middle schools

- Carver Middle School
  - 1988-1989 National Blue Ribbon School
- Magnolia Middle School
- Northwest Middle School

Elementary schools

- Crestwood Elementary School
- Oakland Heights Elementary School
- Parkview Elementary School
- Poplar Springs Elementary School
- T. J. Harris Elementary School
- West Hills Elementary School

=== Former schools ===
- Marion Park Elementary School
  - 1985-1986 National Blue Ribbon School
- Highland Elementary School
- Mount Barton Elementary School
- West End Elementary School
- Witherspoon Elementary School

== Discipline litigation ==
The district agreed in 2013 to change how it disciplined students after the United States Department of Justice sued officials over inappropriate arrests of suspended students.

== Demographics ==
=== 2006-07 school year ===
There were a total of 6,630 students enrolled in the Meridian Public School District during the 2006–2007 school year. The gender makeup of the district was 50% female and 50% male. The racial makeup of the district was 82.90% African American, 15.25% white, 1.09% Hispanic, 0.65% Asian, and 0.12% Native American. 71.7% of the district's students were eligible to receive free lunch.

=== Previous school years ===
School Year	Enrollment	Gender Makeup		Racial Makeup				
School Year	Enrollment	Female	Male	Asian	African American	Hispanic	Native American	White
2005-06	6,730	50%	50%	0.67%	82.23%	0.94%	0.03%	16.14%
2004-05	6,645	50%	50%	0.57%	81.32%	0.92%	0.03%	17.16%
2003-04	6,742	50%	50%	0.43%	80.07%	0.86%	0.04%	18.60%
2002-03	6,695	50%	50%	0.37%	78.61%	0.70%	0.06%	20.25%

== Accountability statistics ==
	2006-07	2005-06	2004-05	2003-04	2002-03
District Accreditation Status	Accredited	Accredited	Accredited	Accredited	Accredited
School Performance Classifications
Level 5 (Superior Performing) Schools	2	1	3	1	1
Level 4 (Exemplary) Schools	2	2	2	5	1
Level 3 (Successful) Schools	8	7	5	4	6
Level 2 (Under Performing) Schools	0	2	2	2	3
Level 1 (Low Performing) Schools	0	0	0	1	1
Not Assigned	0	0	0	0	1

== See also ==
- List of school districts in Mississippi
