= Vanilla UAV =

American UAV

Vanilla Unmanned UAV
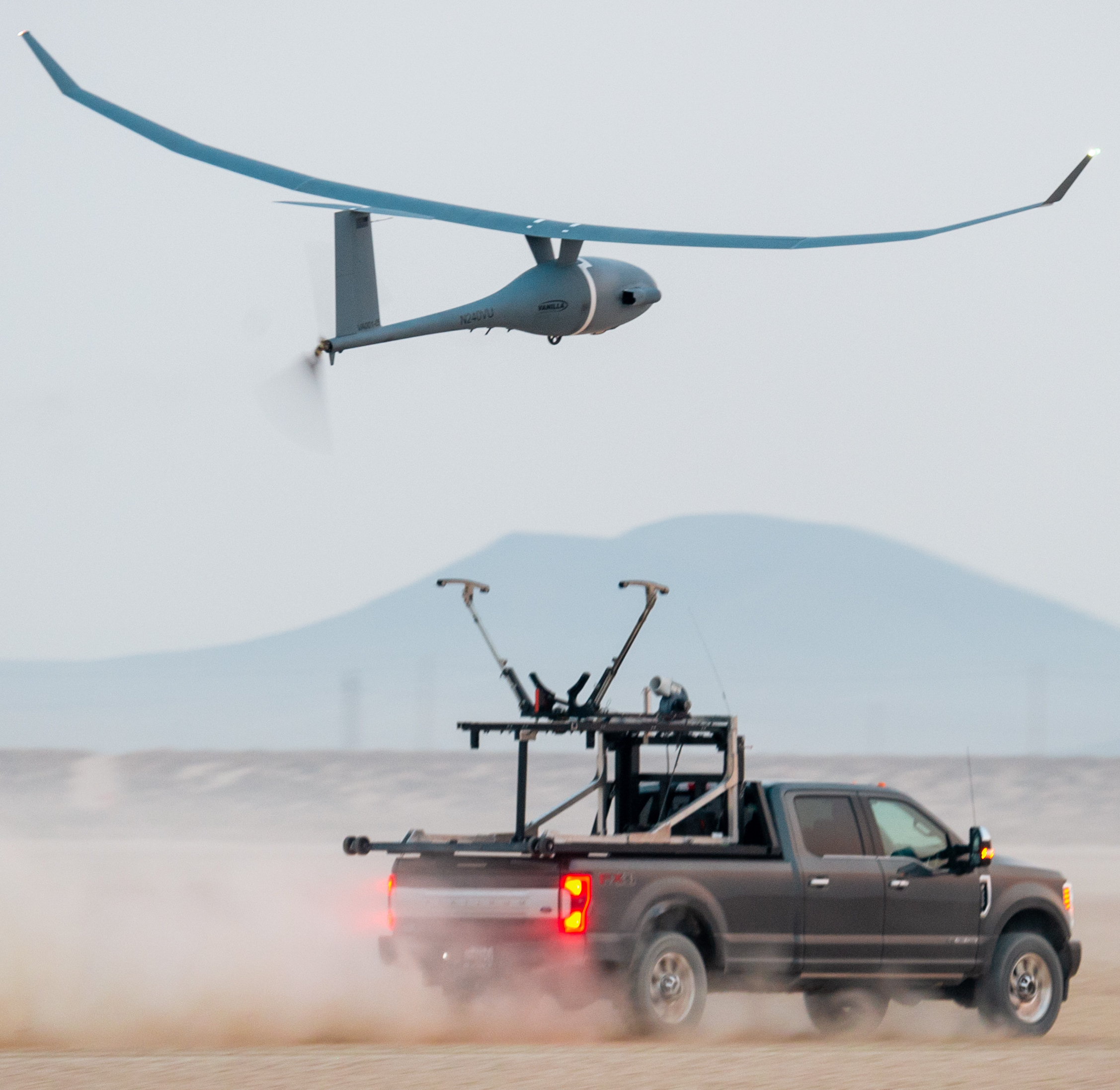
- Vanilla Unmanned UAV takeoff

General information
- Type: Unmanned aerial vehicle
- National origin: United States
- Manufacturer: Vanilla Unmanned
- Status: In development

The Vanilla UAV is a long-endurance, low-cost unmanned aerial vehicle (UAV) produced by American manufacturer Vanilla Unmanned. It has flown unrefueled over 8 days.

== Development ==
Vanilla Unmanned was founded by aerostructures designer Daniel Hatfield, systems engineer Neil Boertlein, and program manager Jeremy Novara. This team designed, built, and flew the VA001 prototype. In October 2020, Vanilla Unmanned was acquired by Platform Aerospace, a provider of aircraft prototyping, modification, and systems integration.

In December 2016, a VA001 set an Fédération Aéronautique Internationale (FAI) world record endurance of 2 days, 7 hours, 56 minutes in Las Cruses New Mexico. In October 2017, a VA001 completed a flight of 5-days, 1-hour, 20-minutes at NASA Wallops in Virginia, covering 7,000 miles (11,265 km) and landing with three days of fuel remaining.

On 2 October 2021, a Vanilla UAV completed an 8 day, 50 minute flight from Edwards AFB in California, flying 10,600 nmi (19,600 km) in circuits, an internal combustion engine-powered UAV record ratified by the FAI. Only the Rutan Voyager has flown longer unrefueled (see flight endurance records).

In November 2021, NASA flew the Vanilla UAV in the Arctic from Deadhorse Airport, Alaska, testing instruments to survey the region, monitoring sea level change, as it could fly for nearly five days over sea ice, Greenland, and Antarctica ice sheets. It carried a radar to measure the depth of snow on top of the sea ice, and ice-detecting sensors, heating systems, and a special anti-icing coating to manage flight in the cold temperatures.

== Design ==
The initial VA001 was powered by a off-the-shelf engine driving a pusher propeller, and was controlled by a Piccolo autopilot. Weighing up to 600 lb (272 kg), it has a 36 ft (11 m) wing span and a 55-gallon (208-litre) fuel capacity. It has a projected endurance of up to 10 days at 55 kn (102 km/h) and up to 15,000 ft (4,600 m), and burning 1 lb (450 g) of jet fuel per hour. The VA001 was launched using a sled and pulled by a towline attached to a pickup truck. It lands at 40 kn (74 km/h) on a single center wheel.

VA001 could carry a 30-pound (14 kg) payload for 10 days. Mission payload options include: electro-optical and synthetic aperture radar sensors for surveillance including maritime surveillance, or acting as a radio relay. Platform Aerospace increased Vanilla's takeoff weight by 75 pounds (34 kg). It can now carry maximum of 150 pounds (68 kg) of payload, or fly over 13,000 nautical miles (24,000 km; 15,000 mi) with a 30-pound (14 kg) payload.

== Specifications (VA001 / Vanilla UAV) ==
Data from Flight 2018

General characteristics

- Capacity: 30 lb (13.6 kg), up to 150 lb (68 kg)
- Wingspan: 36 ft (11 m)
- Wing area: 40 sq ft (3.7 m^{2})
- Gross weight: 600 lb (272 kg)
- Fuel capacity: 55-gallon (208-litre)
- Powerplant: 1 × internal combustion aircraft engine
- Propellers: pusher propeller

Performance

- Maximum speed: 70 kn (81 mph, 130 km/h)
- Cruise speed: 55 kn (63 mph, 102 km/h)
- Range: 13,200 nmi (15,200 mi, 24,400 km)
- Endurance: 10 days
- Service ceiling: 15,000 ft (4,600 m)
- Fuel consumption: 0.016 lb/mi (0.0044 kg/km)
