= Aerovel Corporation =

Aerial systems company

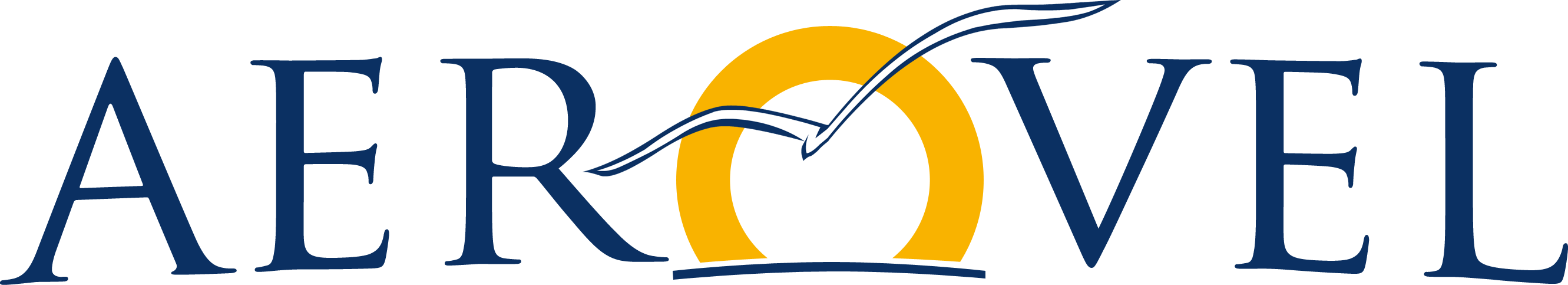
- Type: Private Company
- Industry: Unmanned Aerial Vehicle, Unmanned Aerial System
- Founded: White Salmon, Washington (2006)
- Founder: Dr. Tad McGeer
- Headquarters: Bingen, Washington
- Key people: Dr. Tad McGeer; (President)
- Products: Aerovel Flexrotor
- Number of employees: >20 (as of 03/2019)
- Parent: Airbus (2024–present)

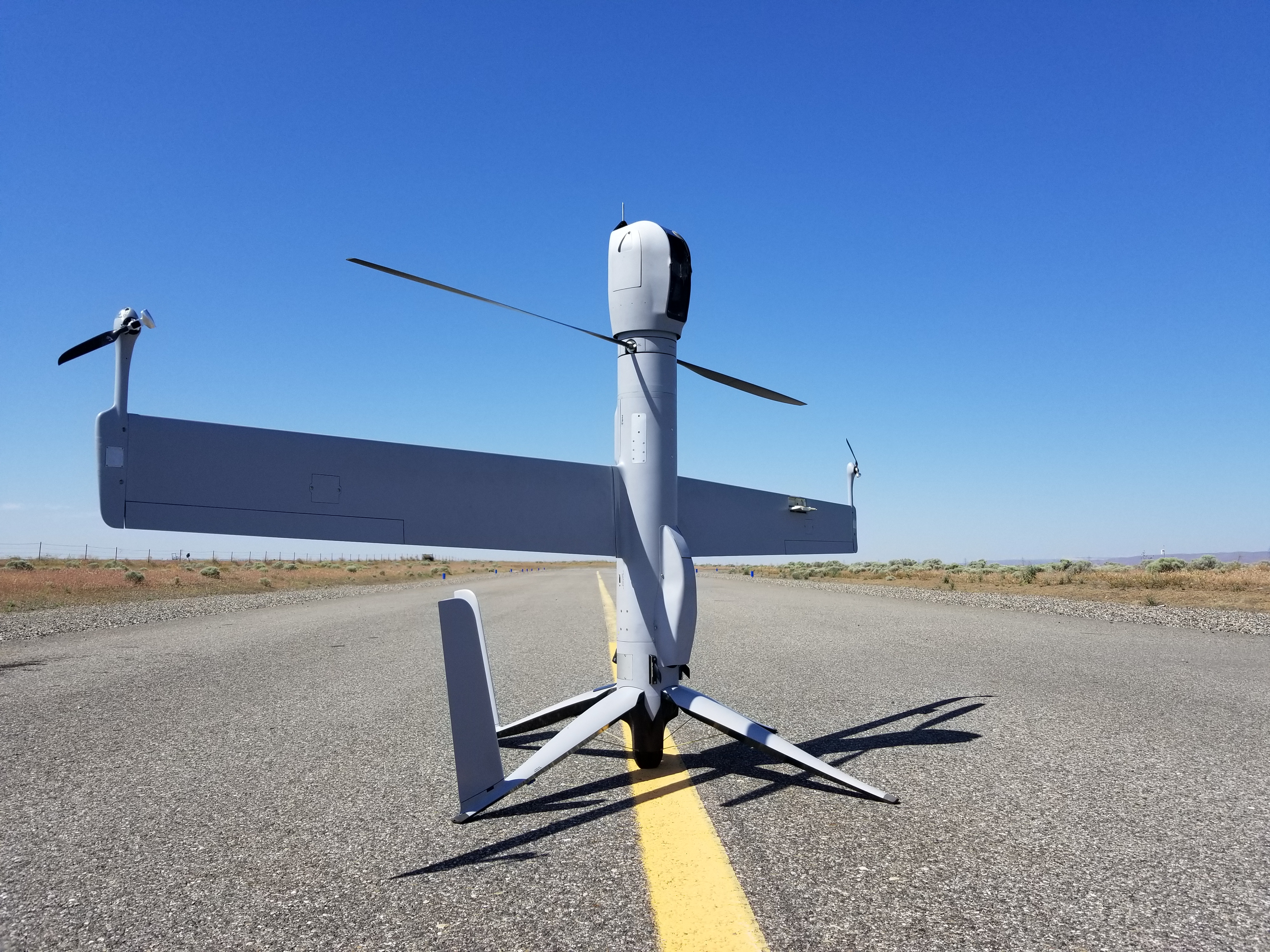
Aerovel Flexrotor

Aerovel Corporation was founded in 2006 by Tad McGeer, a designer of unmanned aerial systems (UAS) at various companies for more than 25 years. McGeer co-founded The Insitu Group in 1992, where he was the architect of Aerosonde, SeaScan and ScanEagle. Aerovel Flexrotor is the next evolution in McGeer's line of unmanned aerial systems.

In January 2024, it was announced that Airbus would acquire the company. When the transaction was completed in May of the same year, Aerovel became part of Airbus' helicopter unit.

== Product ==
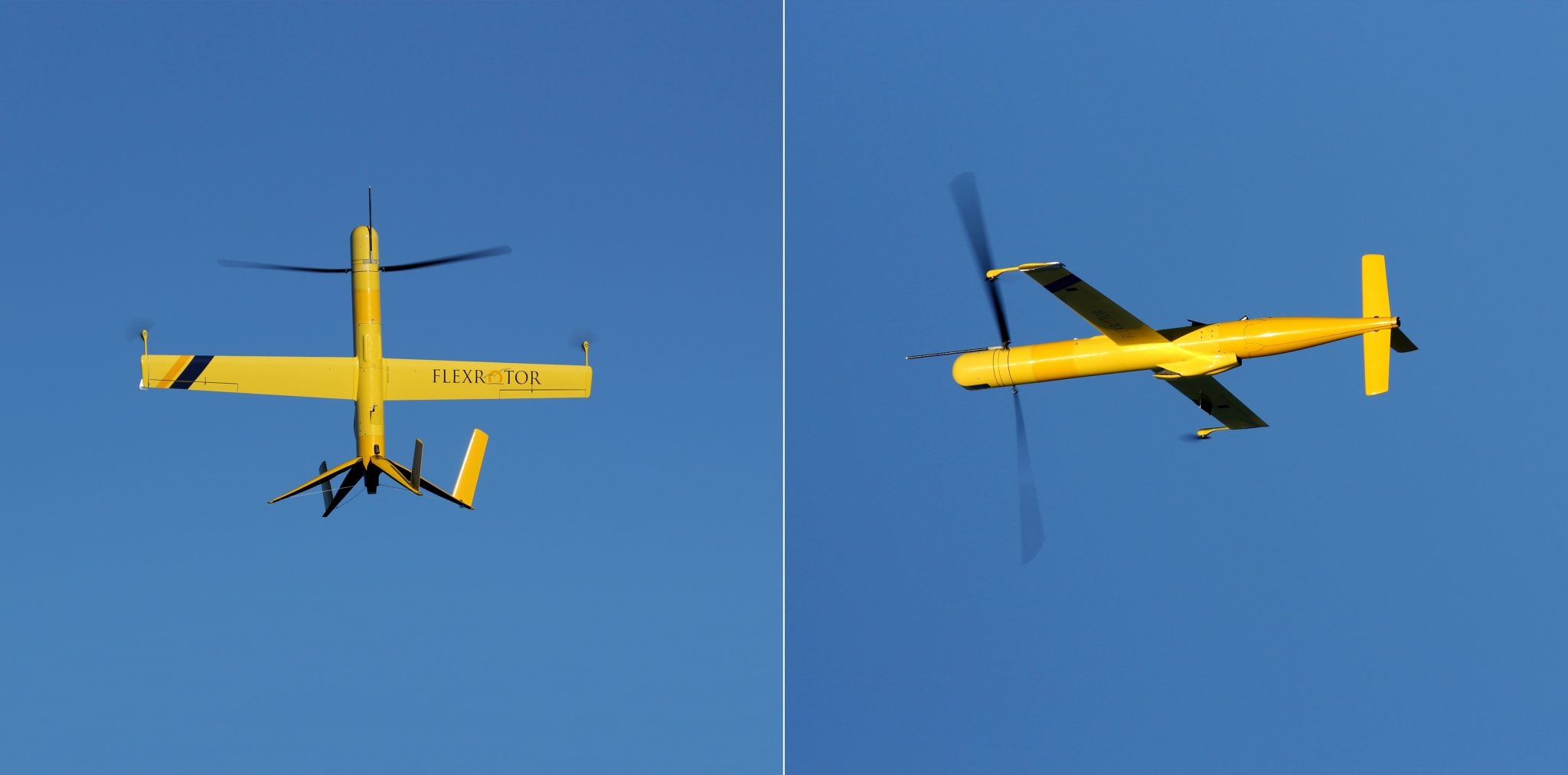
Aerovel Flexrotor

The Aerovel Flexrotor unmanned aerial system (UAS) is designed for maritime and land-based operations, day and night, and combines endurance and expeditionary capabilities. It needs a 20' by 20' area for launch and recovery. Flexrotor takes off and lands vertically (VTOL) and then transitions into horizontal wing-borne flight. It flies completely automatically after takeoff, with no pilot intervention needed. Flexrotor quickly assembles for flight, can be rapidly re-stowed in its compact case for storage and transported on a small flatbed truck.

== Features ==
Aerovel Flexrotor has a flight endurance of more than 32 hours, which is a record-setting Group 2 UAS flight endurance, and a 100-kilometer communications range. It is an all-weather aircraft that has operated in harsh conditions including off of various vessels in the Arctic and tropics.

A fixed-wing aircraft, Aerovel Flexrotor requires no runway or launch and retrieval equipment. It is designed for observation, monitoring, intelligence gathering, communications relay, surveillance, reconnaissance, security and scientific data collection. It can be used for a diverse range of commercial, civil and military applications at sea and on land. Airbus Helicopters acquired this product with their acquisition of Aerovel in January 2024.
