= Timeline of Jackson, Mississippi =

Coordinates: 32.299°N 90.185°W

The following is a timeline of the history of the city of Jackson, Mississippi, USA.

== 19th century ==
- 1821
  - Mississippi capital relocated to Jackson from Natchez.
  - Graveyard established.
- 1822
  - January: State legislature in session.
  - Town laid out.
- 1838 - State Library established.
- 1839 - State House built.
- 1840
  - Vicksburg-Jackson railway begins operating.
  - Jackson chartered as a city.
  - Penitentiary built.
- 1842
  - James H. Boyd becomes mayor.
  - Governor's mansion built.
- 1845 - College opens in Eagle Hotel.
- 1846
  - City Hall built.
  - St. Peter's church dedicated.
- 1847 - Mississippi Institute for the Blind founded.
- 1858 - New Orleans, Jackson and Great Northern Railroad in operation.
- 1861
  - January 7: Secession Convention begins.
  - City becomes Confederate capital of Mississippi.
  - Confederate House (hotel) built.
  - Christy's Minstrels makes its annual visit.
- 1863
  - May 14: Battle of Jackson, Mississippi; Union Army takes city.
  - July 5–25: Siege of Jackson.
- 1864 - July 2–10: Occupation of Jackson by Union Army.
- 1866 - Daily Clarion newspaper begins publication.
- 1867
  - City charter revised.
  - Beth Israel Synagogue built.
- 1868
  - Black and Tan Convention held.
  - Colored Citizen’s Monthly begins publication.
- 1869
  - Mississippi State Fair begins.
  - Tougaloo College established near Jackson.
- 1870
  - People's Journal begins publication.
  - Mississippi Penitentiary Library established.
- 1882 - Natchez-Jackson railway begins operating.
- 1883 - Jackson College for Negroes in operation.
- 1885 - Yazoo City-Jackson railway begins operating.
- 1890
  - Constitutional Convention held.
  - Population: 5,920.
- 1891 - Confederate monument unveiled.
- 1892
  - Millsaps College opens.
  - Jackson Evening News begins publication.
- 1894 - Belhaven College for Young Ladies chartered.
- 1898 - Campbell College relocated to Jackson from Vicksburg.

== 20th century ==
- 1900
  - Cathedral of St. Peter the Apostle dedicated.
  - Population: 7,816.
- 1901 - Century Theatre opens.
- 1902
  - Mississippi Department of Archives and History and State Museum headquartered in city.
  - Art Study Club founded.
  - Population: 7,816.
- 1903 - Mississippi State Capitol building constructed.
- 1906 - YMCA organised locally
- 1910 - Population: 21,262.
- 1911 - Mississippi Art Association formed.
- 1914 - Country Club of Jackson organized.
- 1919 - Jackson Zoo opens.
- 1920 - The Clarion-Ledger newspaper in publication.
- 1920s - NAACP Jackson branch established.
- 1923 - Edwards Hotel built.
- 1925 - Woodrow Wilson Bridge built.
- 1926
  - Mississippi Library Commission headquartered in Jackson.
  - Glendale Methodist Church established.
- 1927 - Municipal Clubhouse Art Gallery opens (approximate date).
- 1929 - WJDX radio begins broadcasting.
- 1930
  - Hinds County Courthouse built.
  - Population: 48,282.
- 1938 - WSLI radio begins broadcasting.
- 1939
  - Jackson Advocate newspaper begins publication.
  - Pix Theatre built.
- 1940 - Population: 62,107.
- 1943 - Alamo Theater built.
- 1944 - Summers Hotel in business.
- 1945 - Jackson Photographic Society founded.
- 1947
  - Radio Service Company in business (approximate date).
  - Mississippi Progressive Voters' League headquartered in city (approximate date).
- 1949 - Allen C. Thompson becomes mayor.
- 1950
  - Trumpet Records in business.
  - Population: 98,271.
- 1953 - WLBT-TV (television) begins broadcasting.
- 1954 - WJTV (television) begins broadcasting.
- 1955
  - University of Mississippi Medical Center opens.
  - Ace Records in business.
- 1960 - Population: 144,422.
- 1961 - Freedom Rides begin.
- 1962
  - Jackson Veterans Administration Hospital opens.
  - Council of Federated Organizations headquartered in city.
  - Mississippi Coliseum built.
- 1963
  - May 28: Woolworth sit-in.
  - June 12: Medgar Evers assassinated.
- 1966
  - June 26: March Against Fear arrives from Memphis.
  - Subway Lounge opens.
- 1967 - Malaco recording studio in business.
- 1970
  - May 14: Jackson State killings.
  - Public schools desegregated.
  - Hinds Community College campus opens.
  - Population: 153,968.
- 1970s - Queen of Hearts music club opens.
- 1975
  - Jackson Mets baseball team relocates to Jackson.
  - Smith–Wills Stadium opens.
  - Lemuria Books in business.
- 1976 - Jackson Camellia Society founded.
- 1977 - Roman Catholic Diocese of Jackson established.
- 1978 - Southern Coalition for Educational Equity headquartered in city.
- 1979 - April: Flood.
- 1980 - Population: 202,895.
- 1983 - Dons nightclub in business.
- 1984 - Methodist WellsFest begins.
- 1985 - City adopts mayor-council form of government.
- 1989 - J. Kane Ditto becomes mayor.
- 1990
  - 100 Black Men of Jackson (nonprofit organization) founded.
  - Population: 196,637.
- 1991 - Garden Club of Jackson organized.
- 1997 - Harvey Johnson, Jr. becomes mayor.
- 1999 - City website online.

== 21st century ==
- 2000
  - Goldring / Woldenberg Institute of Southern Jewish Life founded.
  - Population: 184,256.
- 2002
  - Jackson Free Press begins publication.
  - Jackson Senators baseball team formed.
- 2005
  - Frank Melton becomes mayor.
  - Mississippi Children's Museum opens (December 4, 2005).
- 2006 - Eudora Welty House museum opens.
- 2008 - Mississippi Black Leadership Summit begins.
- 2009
  - Leslie B. McLemore becomes mayor, succeeded by Harvey Johnson, Jr.
  - Gregg Harper becomes U.S. representative for Mississippi's 3rd congressional district.
- 2010
  - The Help (movie) filmed in Jackson.
  - Population: 173,514.
- 2012 - Population Est.: 175,437
- 2013 - Chokwe Lumumba becomes mayor.
- 2014
  - Charles Tillman becomes interim mayor.
  - Tony Yarber elected mayor April 22.
- 2020 - State Flag is replaced

== See also ==
- Jackson history
- List of mayors of Jackson, Mississippi
- List of Landmarks in Hinds County
- National Register of Historic Places listings in Hinds County, Mississippi

== Bibliography ==
Published in the 19th century

- "Jackson, Mississippi". De Bow's Review. USA. 1859.
- Jackson (Miss (1867). Charter of the City of Jackson.
- "Jackson (Mississippi)" . Encyclopædia Britannica. Vol. 13 (9th ed.). 1881.
- "Jackson, Mississippi". Southern Homeseeker's Guide: And Winter Resorts on the Southern Division of the Illinois Central Railroad. Cedar Rapids, Iowa. 1889.

Published in the 20th century

- Dunbar Rowland, ed. (1907), "Jackson", Encyclopedia of Mississippi history, Madison, Wisconsin: S. A. Brant, hdl:2027/nyp.33433081846085
- Dudley Weldon Woodard (1909), Negro progress in a Mississippi town: being a study of conditions in Jackson, Mississippi, Cheyney, Pa.: Committee of Twelve for the Advancement of the Interests of the Negro Race, OL 13501287M
- "Jackson (Mississippi)" . Encyclopædia Britannica. Vol. 15 (11th ed.). 1910. pp. 111–112.
- "Jackson Miss.". Automobile Blue Book. New York: Automobile Blue Book Publishing Co. 1919. + Map
- Federal Writers' Project (1949), "Jackson", Mississippi; a guide to the Magnolia State, New York: Viking, OCLC 478887
- George Thomas Kurian (1994), "Jackson, Mississippi", World Encyclopedia of Cities, vol. 1: North America, Santa Barbara, Calif.: ABC-CLIO, OL 1431653M – via Internet Archive (fulltext)
- Ory Mazar Nergal, ed. (1980), "Jackson, MS", Encyclopedia of American Cities, New York: E.P. Dutton, OL 4120668M
- Olurominiyi O. Ibitayo (1999). "The Quality of Low-Income Neighborhoods in Jackson, Mississippi: The Residents' Viewpoints". Humboldt Journal of Social Relations. 25 (2): 97–125. JSTOR 23263371.

Published in the 21st century

- David Barton Smith (2005). "The Politics of Racial Disparities: Desegregating the Hospitals in Jackson, Mississippi". Milbank Quarterly. 83.
- Joan Marshall Wesley; et al. (2005). "Urban Segregation in the Deep South: Race, Education, and Planning Ethics in Jackson, Mississippi". Race, Gender & Class. 12.
- "36 Hours in Jackson, Miss". New York Times. May 30, 2013.
