= Statue of Andrew Jackson (Jackson, Mississippi) =

Statue of Andrew Jackson in Jackson, Mississippi, U.S.

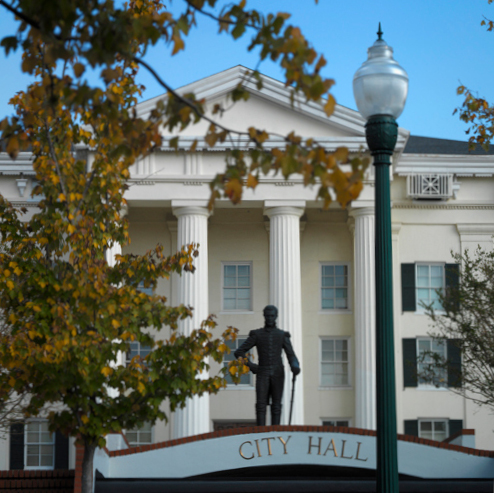
- Interactive map of Statue of Andrew Jackson
- Location: Jackson, Mississippi
- Coordinates: 32°17′52.2″N 90°10′58.6″W
- Designer: Katherine Rhymes Speed
- Material: Bronze
- Height: 10 Feet
- Beginning date: 1967
- Dedicated date: 1972
- Dedicated to: Andrew Jackson

A bronze statue of Andrew Jackson is located outside the City Hall of Jackson, Mississippi, United States. It was sculpted by Katherine Rhymes Speed, who was the widow of the former mayor Leland Speed, and dedicated in 1972.

In 2020 during a period of racial unrest, Mayor Chokwe Antar Lumumba requested that the City Council vote to remove the statue, which they did. Despite that the statue remains and no progress to remove it has occurred.

== History ==
Jackson, Mississippi, was founded in 1821 and named after Jackson for his victory at the recent Battle of New Orleans.

The statue was commissioned by the Keep Jackson Beautiful non-profit for the Josh Halbert Gardens park that the non-profit had just created. Katherine Rhymes Speed, an amateur sculptress and the widow of the city's former Mayor, was commissioned to create the statue in 1967 for $15,600. The statue stands 10 feet (3.0 m) tall and stands atop a marble base surrounded by fountains, it was formally dedicated in 1972.

In 2020, nationwide protests against racism and police brutality erupted following the murder of George Floyd by an on-duty police officer; many monuments and memorials were removed or destroyed, in particular those associated with racial injustice. Mayor Chokwe Antar Lumumba asked the City Council to authorize him to remove the statue, which was approved in a 5–1 vote. The sole vote against came from a White councilor claiming to respect history. The 7th council member, De'Keither Stamps, left the room when discussions for removal started. Lumumba said that removal of the statue helps to divorce the city's name from Andrew Jackson, and that he planned to reclaim the name "Jackson" which he said means "God has shown favor". In a group chat with several other Black mayors, Lumumba told Frank Scott Jr. of Little Rock, Arkansas that he considered the statue part of a problem with his desire to move city hall to a different location.

Following the vote for removal it was discovered that under the Antiquities Law of Mississippi the Mississippi Department of Archives and History's Board of Trustees would need to review the statue and then would vote on if a Permit to remove it will be given. The planning director at the time of the 2020 vote later left and since then no notice of intent has been forwarded to the MDAH, with later directors prioritized other issues. Plans for a removal date and where to send the statue have not occurred as of 2024. The cost of removal is estimated to be more than $1 million.

Later after Mayor Lumumba and a council member who voted on the statue were convicted of unrelated federal bribery charges, the removal of the statue was brought up by supporters of Lumumba to argue for his legacy.

== See also ==
- List of sculptures of presidents of the United States
- Presidential memorials in the United States
