= Doug Shanks =

American basketball coach (1946–2023)

Douglas Shanks
Current position
- Title: Head coach
- Team: Central Hinds Academy

Biographical details
- Born: October 25, 1946; Soso, Mississippi, U.S.
- Died: September 4, 2023 (aged 76)

Coaching career (HC unless noted)
- 1990–2000: University Christian School (MS)
- 2001–2014: Mississippi Valley State
- 2015–present: Central Hinds Academy (MS)

Head coaching record
- Overall: 253–471
- Tournaments: SWAC: 0–0; NCAA: 0–0

Douglas William Shanks (October 25, 1946 – September 4, 2023) was an American college baseball coach. He was a city commissioner of Jackson, Mississippi and was on their city council. He served as the head coach of the Mississippi Valley State Devils (2001–2014).

== Early life ==
Shanks was born on October 25, 1946, in Soso, Mississippi. Shanks was the son of Fred David and Frances (McMillan) Shanks. Shanks graduated from Provine High School in 1964. He then graduated from Liberty University.

== Political career ==
Shanks had wanted to become the mayor of Jackson, Mississippi, since he was a teenager. Before 1977, he served as the Jackson director of public relations. He was the city commissioner of Jackson, Mississippi from 1973 to 1977, under mayor Russell C. Davis. In 1973, he became the first Republican to serve on the Jackson City Council. In 1977 and 1981, as a Republican, he ran for mayor against Democrat Dale Danks, but lost.

== Coaching career ==
In 2001, Shanks became the first white head coach of a major sport at Mississippi Valley State, when he became the head baseball coach there. After 14 seasons at Mississippi Valley State University, Shanks retired from coaching college baseball to become the head coach at Central Hinds Academy.

== Book ==
In 2020, Shanks co-wrote and published a book that details the history of southern Jackson from 1945 to 1965, called One Direction Home.

== Personal life ==
He married Kay Guest in 1975. They had four children together. One son, Fred, is a member of the Mississippi House of Representatives from Brandon.

== Head coaching record ==
Statistics overview
Season	Team	Overall	Conference	Standing	Postseason
Mississippi Valley State Delta Devils (Southwestern Athletic Conference) (2001–2014)
2001	Mississippi Valley State	12–36	10–16	(East)	
2002	Mississippi Valley State	10–42	10–15	5th (East)	
2003	Mississippi Valley State	29–29	22–6	1st (East)	SWAC Tournament
2004	Mississippi Valley State	35–23	23–9	1st (East)	SWAC Tournament
2005	Mississippi Valley State	19–30	18–6	1st (East)	SWAC Tournament
2006	Mississippi Valley State	24–32	20–4	1st (East)	SWAC Tournament
2007	Mississippi Valley State	19–36	14–10	3rd (East)	SWAC Tournament
2008	Mississippi Valley State	18–26	13–10	3rd (East)	SWAC Tournament
2009	Mississippi Valley State	20–30	15–5	1st (East)	SWAC Tournament
2010	Mississippi Valley State	23–30	16–8	2nd (East)	SWAC Tournament
2011	Mississippi Valley State	18–36	14–9	2nd (East)	SWAC Tournament
2012	Mississippi Valley State	17–39	10–14	4th (East)	SWAC Tournament
2013	Mississippi Valley State	5–44	1–21	5th (East)	
2014	Mississippi Valley State	4–38	4–18	5th (East)	
Mississippi Valley State:		253–471	190–151		
Total:		253–471			
National champion Postseason invitational champion Conference regular season champion Conference regular season and conference tournament champion Division regular season champion Division regular season and conference tournament champion Conference tournament champion
