= Senator Wharton =

Senator Wharton may refer to:

- Charles Wharton (American football) (1871–1949), Delaware State Senate
- Ramsey Wharton (1855–1908), Mississippi State Senate
- William H. Wharton (1802–1839), Senate of the Republic of Texas
