= Manship House =

Manship House may refer to:

- Manship House (Baton Rouge, Louisiana), listed on the National Register of Historic Places in East Baton Rouge Parish, Louisiana
- Manship House (Jackson, Mississippi), listed on the National Register of Historic Places in Hinds County, Mississippi
