= Ramsey Wharton =

American politician

Mayor of Jackson, Mississippi
- In office 1897–1899
- Preceded by: Oliver Clifton
- Succeeded by: H. M. Taylor
- In office January 18, 1905 – November 1908
- Preceded by: Oliver Clifton
- Succeeded by: A. C. Crowder

Member of the Mississippi Senate from the 12th district
- In office January 1900 – January 1904

Personal details
- Born: October 10, 1855 Mississippi
- Died: November 1908 (aged 53)
- Party: Democrat

Ramsey Wharton (October 10, 1855 - November 1908) was an American politician and the mayor of Jackson, Mississippi, from 1897 to 1899 and from January 18, 1905 to November 1908. He also was in the Mississippi Senate, representing the 12th district, from 1900 to 1904. He was a Democrat.

== Biography ==
Wharton was born on October 10, 1855, in Mississippi. He was in the insurance business. He first became the mayor of Jackson, Mississippi, from 1897 to 1899. He was elected to the Mississippi State Senate in 1899, representing Hinds County, and served until 1904. He became the mayor of Jackson again on January 18, 1905, after a special election was held to fill the vacancy of resigning mayor William Hemingway. He continued serving as mayor until his death of acute indigestion in November 1908.
