= List of mayors of Jackson, Mississippi =

The post of Mayor of Jackson, Mississippi, was begun in 1834 and was originally referred to as "President of Selectmen" before being changed to "Mayor". Harvey Johnson Jr. elected in 1997 became the city's first black mayor. All of the mayors since have also been African American. The following individuals have held the office:

== President of Selectmen ==
Image	President of Selectmen	Years	Notes/Citation
	Thomas H. Dickson	1834	
	S.P. Baley	1835	
	Thomas H. Dickson	1836	
	S.P. Baley	1836	
	John P. Oldham	1837–1838	

== Mayors ==
Image	Mayor	Years	Notes/Citation
	John P. Oldham	1839	
	H.R. McDonald	1840	
	John P. Oldham (2nd term)	1840–1841	
	James H. Boyd	1842–1843	
	John P. Oldham (3rd term)	1844–1849	
	James H. Boyd (2nd term)	1850	
	J.P. Jones	1851	
	William H. Taylor	1852–1853	
	Richard Fletcher	1854	
	William H. Taylor (2nd term)	1855–1857	
	James H. Boyd (3rd term)	1858	
	W.A. Purdom	1859	
	Richard C. Kerr	1860–1861	
	Charles Henry Manship	1862–1863	
	D.N. Barrows	1864–1867	
	Maj. Thomas H. Norton	1868	Union officer appointed as mayor
	Bvt. Lt. Col. James Biddle	1868	Union officer appointed as mayor
	Col. James P. Sessions (J. P. Sessions)	1868–1869	Native of Natchez, Mississippi, former Confederate officer, died April 3, 1886
	Rhesa Hatcher	1869	
	Bvt. Lt. Col. Joseph G. Crane	1869	Union officer appointed as mayor; stabbed to death by Edward M. Yerger, a former Confederate officer
	Captain F.A. Field	1869	Union officer appointed as mayor
	A. Way Kelly	1869	
	E. W. Cabaniss	1869–1870	
	Oliver Clifton	1870–1871	
	Rhesa Hatcher (2nd term)	1871–1872	
	Marion Smith	1872–1874	
	John McGill	1874–1888	
	William Henry	1888–1893	
	L.F. Chiles	1893–1895	He served as Assistant Secretary of the Mississippi Senate He was also a deputy sheriff, alderman, and secretary of the Mississippi Fair Association. Testimony was given he proposed taking Charlie Morgan down to the swamp and tying him to a tree with someone posted to watch him until after an election because he was a leader of "negroes"
	Oliver Clifton (2nd term)	1895–1897	
	Ramsey Wharton	1897–1899	
	H.M. Taylor	1899	
	W.W. Morrison	1899	Mayor Pro Tem
	John W. Todd	1899–1901	
	William Hemingway	1901–1905	
	Oliver Clifton † (3rd term)	1905	died before taking office
	Ramsey Wharton † (2nd term)	1905 – November 1908	Died in office
	A.C. Crowder	1909–1913	
	Swepson James Taylor	1913–1917	
	Walter A. Scott	1917–1945	
	Leland L. Speed	1945–1949	
	Allen C. Thompson	1949–1969	
	Russell C. Davis	1969–1977	
	Dale Danks	1977–1989	
	J. Kane Ditto	1989–1997	
	Harvey Johnson, Jr.	1997–2005	first African American Mayor of Jackson
	Frank Melton †	2005–2009	died in office
	Leslie B. McLemore	2009	interim mayor
	Harvey Johnson Jr. (2nd term)	2009–2013	
	Chokwe Lumumba †	2013–2014	died in office
	Charles Tillman	2014	
	Tony Yarber	2014–2017	
	Chokwe Antar Lumumba	2017–2025	
	John Horhn	2025–present	

== See also ==
- Timeline of Jackson, Mississippi

== Additional sources ==
- Brinson, Carroll. Jackson/A Special Kind of Place. Jackson, MS: City of Jackson, 1977. LCCN 77-081145.
