= Manship =

Manship may refer to:

- The characteristic of being a man
  - Maleness, the characteristic, state or condition of being male
  - Masculinity, The degree or property of being masculine

== People ==
- Charles Henry Manship (1812–1895), mayor of Jackson, Mississippi
- David Manship, current publisher of The Advocate
- Deborah Manship (born 1953), Welsh actress
- Douglas Manship Sr., former publisher of The Advocate, namesake of The Manship Theatre at Louisiana State University
- James Renwick Manship, American historian
- Jeff Manship (born 1985), American baseball player
- Paul Manship (1885–1966), American sculptor
