= Jackson City Hall =

- Municipal Building
- U.S. National Register of Historic Places
- Mississippi Landmark
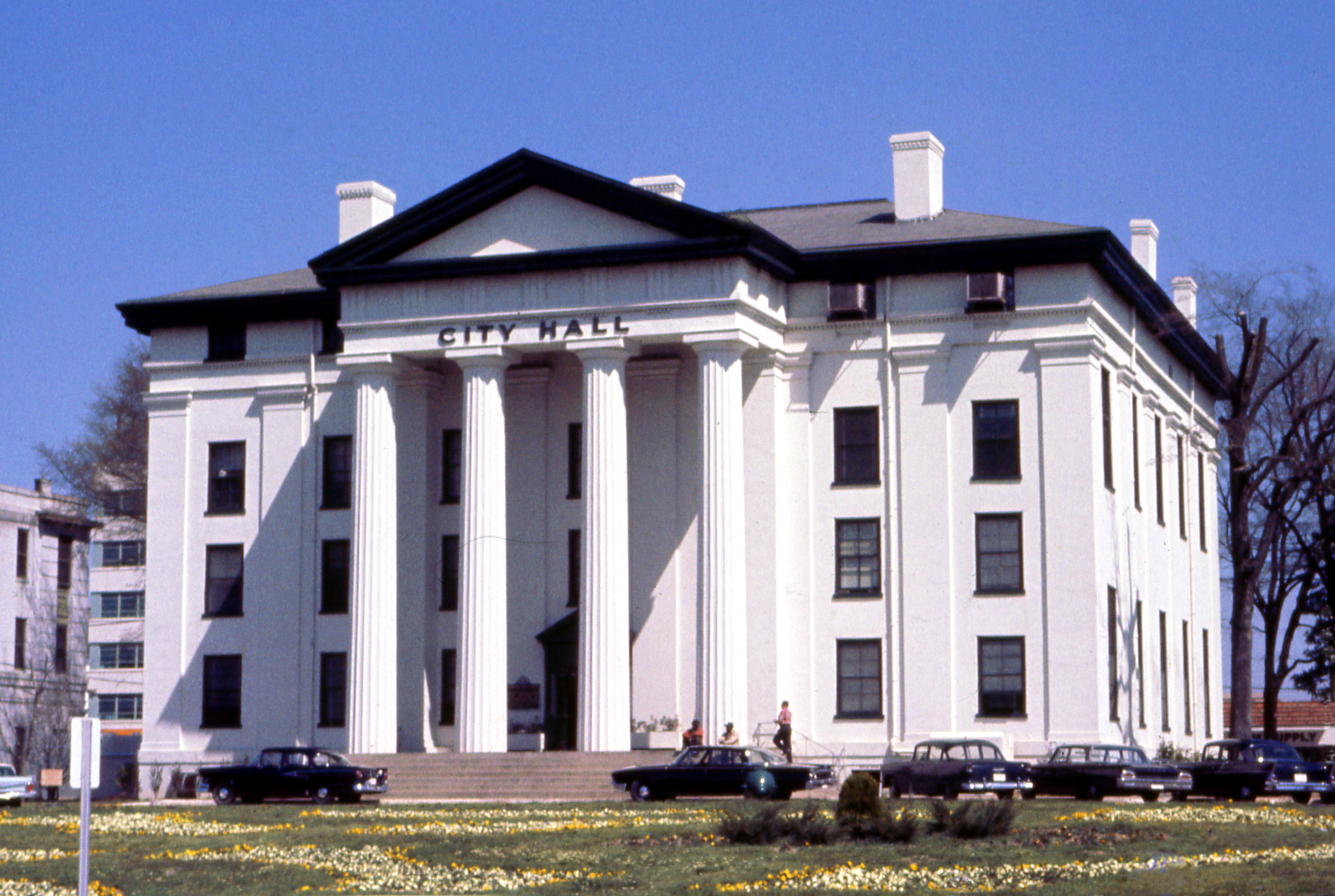
- Jackson City Hall, circa 1960

- Location within Mississippi Location within the United States
- Location: 203 South President Street, Jackson, Mississippi
- Coordinates: 32°17′52″N 90°10′56″W
- Built: 1853-54
- Architect: William Gibbons; Joseph Willis
- Architectural style: Greek Revival
- Restored: 1963-64
- NRHP reference No.: 69000084
- USMS No.: 049-JAC-0447.1-NR-ML

Significant dates
- Added to NRHP: November 25, 1969
- Designated USMS: March 5, 1986

Jackson City Hall, located in Jackson, Mississippi, is the seat of municipal government.

== History ==
Originally constructed in 1846–47 at a cost of $8,000, the building was either enlarged or rebuilt in 1853-54 because of structural problems.

During the American Civil War, the building was used as a hospital and was left standing by Federal troops despite heavy damage inflicted on other buildings throughout Jackson. Speculation was that General Sherman, a Freemason, spared the building because it housed a Masonic Lodge, though a more likely reason is that it housed an army hospital.

The building underwent extensive renovation in 1963–64, which was undertaken by architect Frank P. Gates.

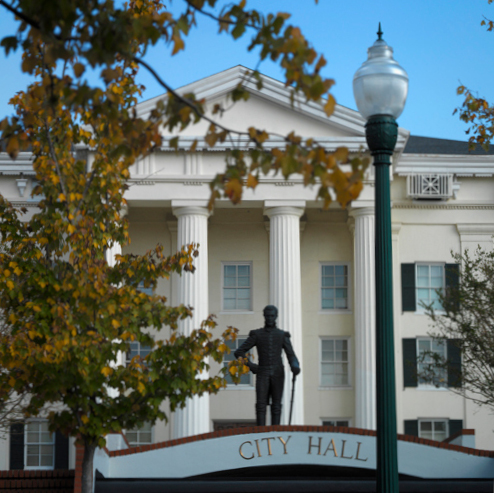
Andrew Jackson statue at City Hall

In 1968, a statue of Andrew Jackson, made by Katherine Speed Ettl, wife of former Jackson mayor Leland Speed, was installed in front of the building. As of July 2020, the statue is slated for removal.
