= Vaught–Hemingway Stadium =

Outdoor athletic stadium located in University, Mississippi

Vaught–Hemingway Stadium/Hollingsworth Field
- "The Vaught"
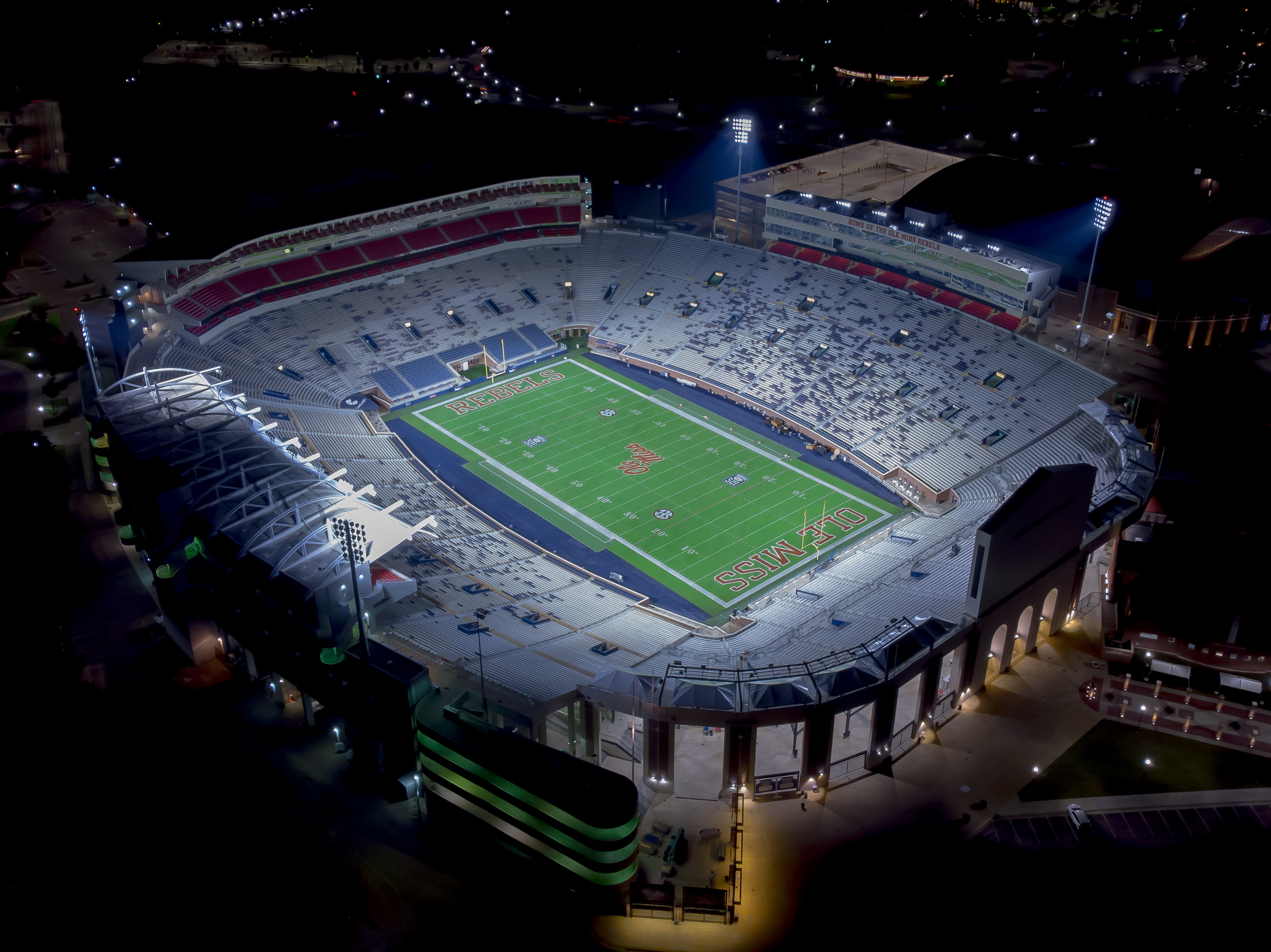

- Location in Mississippi Location in the United States
- Full name: Vaught–Hemingway Stadium at Hollingsworth Field
- Former names: Hemingway Stadium (1915–1982)
- Location: 6 All American Drive; Oxford, Mississippi 38655
- Coordinates: 34°21′43″N 89°32′3″W
- Owner: University of Mississippi
- Operator: University of Mississippi
- Capacity: 24,000 (1915–1949); 34,500 (1950–1972); 37,500 (1973–1974); 35,000 (1975–1979); 42,500 (1980–1984); 41,000 (1985–1987); 42,577 (1988–1997); 50,577 (1998–2001); 60,580 (2002–2014); 59,347 (2015); 64,038 (2016–present, standing room to at least 70,033)
- Surface: Grass (2016–present); FieldTurf (2009–2015); AstroPlay (2003–2008); Grass (1984–2002); AstroTurf (1970–1983); Grass (1915–1969)
- Scoreboard: Daktronics 49' by 110' HD Jumbotron
- Record attendance: 70,033; September 19, 2026 vs. LSU

Construction
- Groundbreaking: 1912
- Built: 1912–1915
- Opened: October 1, 1915
- Renovated: 1941, 1980, 2002, 2015, 2016
- Expanded: 1950, 1980, 1988, 1998, 2002, 2016
- Cost: $96,000 ($3.06 million in 2025 dollars) $25 million (renovation)

Tenant
- Ole Miss Rebels (NCAA) (1915–present)

Vaught–Hemingway Stadium is an outdoor athletic stadium located in University, Mississippi, United States (although it has an Oxford address). The stadium serves as the home for the University of Mississippi Rebels college football team. The stadium is named after Johnny Vaught and Judge William Hemingway.

== History ==
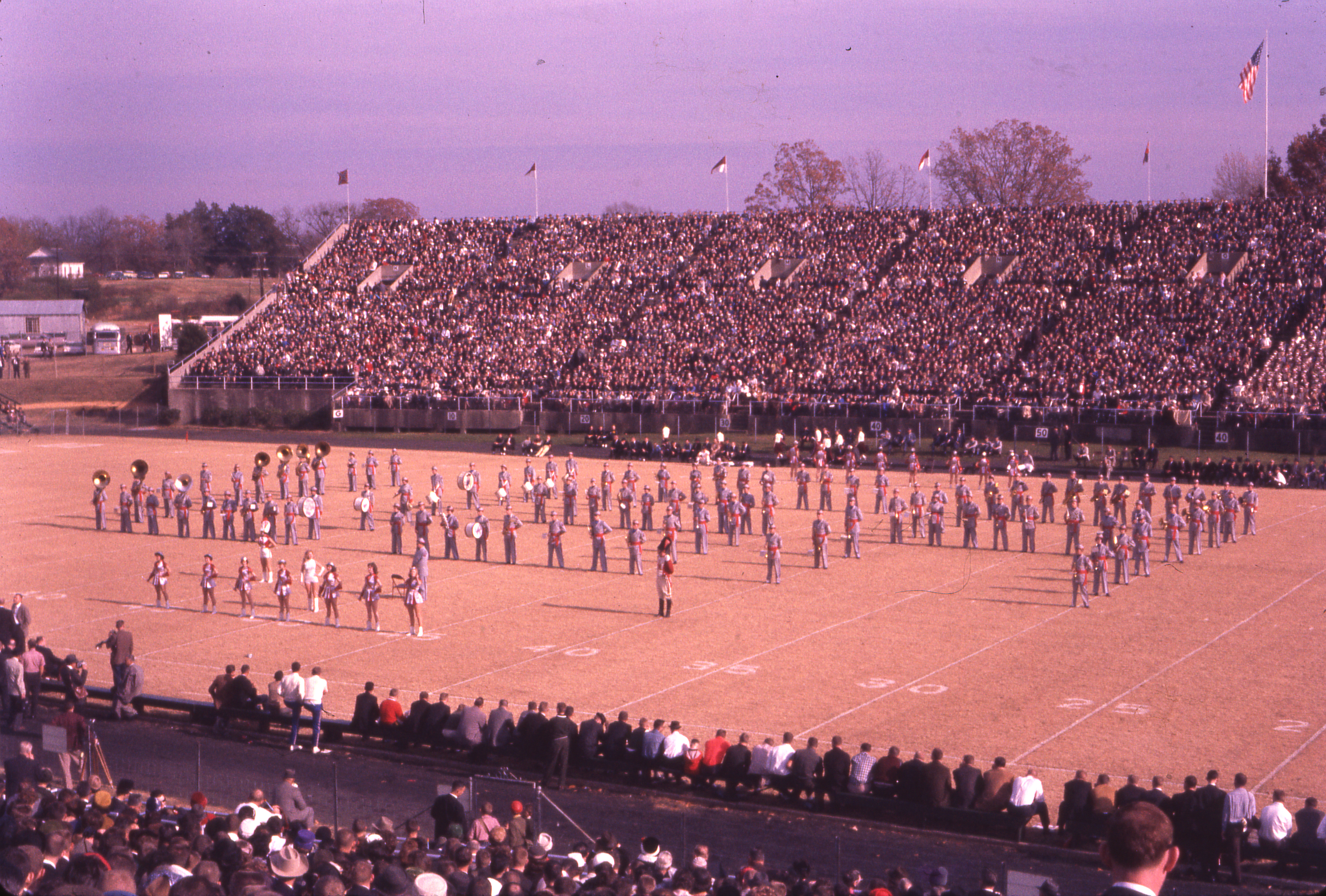
Football game at Hemingway Stadium, circa 1960

Building of the stadium started in 1915 as a federally sponsored project. A series of expansions and renovations have gradually expanded the stadium and modernized its amenities, allowing the Rebels to play all of their home games on campus. Prior to the early to mid-1990s, Ole Miss would play many of its big rivalry games, including the heated feuds with LSU, Mississippi State, Tennessee, and Arkansas at Mississippi Veterans Memorial Stadium in the state capital of Jackson, located approximately 170 miles (270 km) south of the Ole Miss campus; and to a lesser extent, the Liberty Bowl Memorial Stadium in Memphis. The Ole Miss-MSU game, commonly referred to as the Egg Bowl, was held in Jackson every year from 1973 through 1990 before returning to a home-and-home series.

=== Namesake ===
When the stadium opened, it was named for Judge William Hemingway, a professor of law and chairman of the university's committee on athletics. October 12, 1982 saw the addition of legendary Ole Miss coach Johnny Vaught's name to the stadium. September 5, 1998 saw the field named for longtime supporter Dr. Jerry Hollingsworth, bringing the current official title to "Vaught–Hemingway Stadium at Hollingsworth Field".

=== Expansions and upgrades ===
In 2002, construction crews replaced the south end zone bleachers with a rounded bowl, adding luxury boxes and covered club seating in an upper deck, as well as additional general admission seating for students and season ticket holders; these renovations expanded seating capacity by nearly 10,000, giving Vaught–Hemingway a capacity of 60,580.

In August 2011, the school announced Forward Together, a new capital campaign that would seek to build a new basketball arena and expand the stadium. Phase 1 of the campaign includes adding 30 luxury suites and 770 club level seats. In addition new stadium lights, sound system, and two new video boards will be added to the current south end zone. Phase 2 calls for the stadium's capacity to increase giving it the ability to hold 64,038 fans. This would be done through closing off the north endzone. In addition, a plaza would be built outside the north endzone to serve as a "front door" to the stadium and celebrate Ole Miss tradition and history. In the summer of 2012, Ole Miss announced that they had received a million-dollar gift that was to be used in the Forward Together capital campaign. The school announced, in honor of the gift, that they would start a new tradition and include a bell tower in the north endzone expansion that would be rung before Ole Miss games after Ole Miss victories.

The most recent expansion, completed in 2016, completed the stadium's bowl shape and added 3,458 additional seats. This brought the total capacity to 64,038, making Vaught–Hemingway the largest stadium in the state.

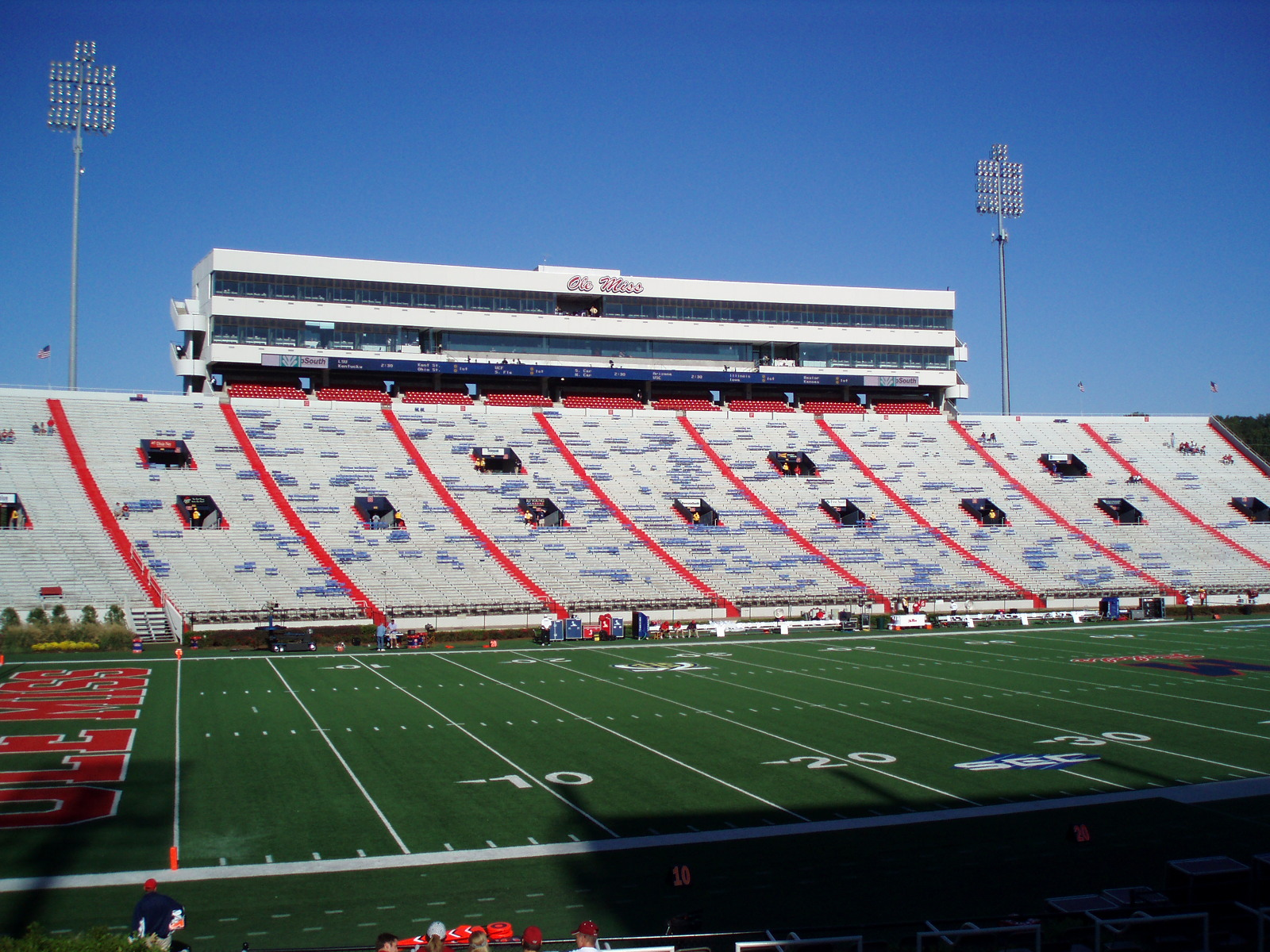
The press box was added in a 1988 renovation.

Other notable upgrades include the installation of lights in 1990, the addition of a Jumbotron in 1997, and the replacement of the natural grass turf, which had become increasingly hard to maintain, with an AstroPlay artificial turf surface in 2003. Ironically, the stadium had been among the first in the nation to switch from a natural grass playing surface to artificial turf in 1970, and then one of the first of those stadiums to switch back to natural grass in 1984. The field surface was again changed in 2009 from AstroPlay to FieldTurf, making Ole Miss the first team in the Southeastern Conference to play their home games on the surface. In 2016, the stadium's field surface was changed back to natural grass for the third time.

=== Top 10 single game attendances ===
Rankings are from the AP Poll.

Rank	Date	Attendance	Opponent	Result
1	September 19, 2026	70,033	#7 LSU	W 32–24
2	November 7, 2026	68,814	#2 Georgia	L 7-42
3	December 20, 2025	68,251	#17 Tulane	W 41–10
4	November 15, 2025	68,138	Florida	W 34–24
5	September 12, 2026	68,134	Charlotte	W 41–9
6	November 9, 2024	68,126	#2 Georgia	W 28–10
7	October 26, 2024	67,926	Oklahoma	W 26–14
8	November 29, 2024	67,896	Mississippi State	W 26–14
9	September 27, 2025	67,737	#4 LSU	W 24–19
10	September 28, 2024	67,616	Kentucky	L 17-20

== Manning Center indoor practice facility ==
In 2004, a 150,000-square-foot (14,000 m^{2}) indoor practice facility and locker room facility was opened. It is linked to the existing stadium via a secured tunnel.

== Video display ==
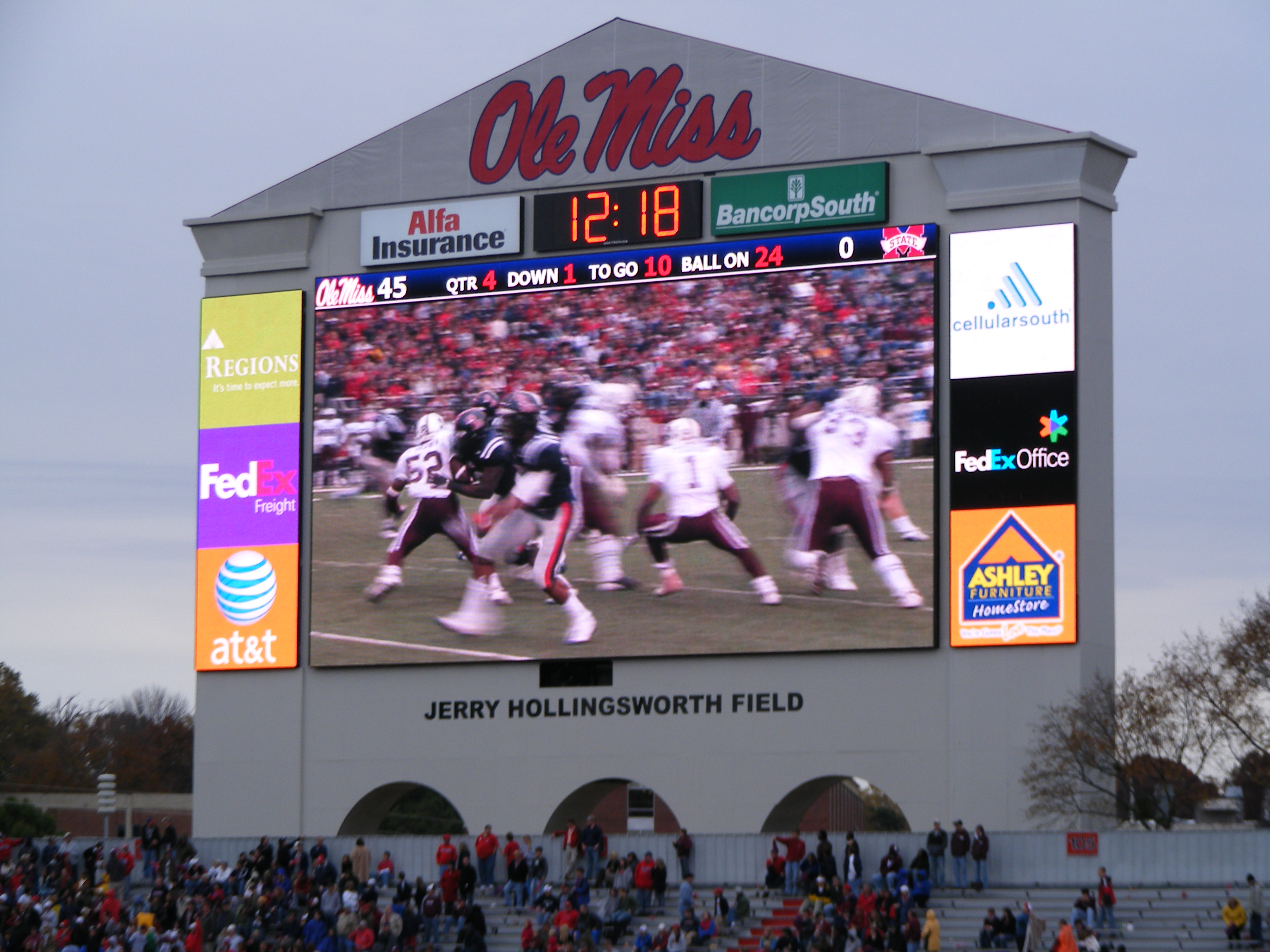
The new display cost $6 million.

For the 2008 season, Vaught–Hemingway Stadium got a new HD Daktronics video board to replace the Sony Jumbotron that had been installed in the north endzone in 1997. The new board is the 8th largest scoreboard in NCAA college football (fourth in the Southeastern conference), measuring at 48 ft (15 m) by 84 ft (26 m) (4,032 square feet). Ole Miss' board cost $6 million, all of which was paid for by Telesouth Communications as part of a multimedia rights agreement with the university.

In 2016, Vaught–Hemingway upgraded to three new 13mm pixel HD video boards by Daktronics. The north board measures 48 ft (14 m) by 104.5 ft (31 m) (5,016 square feet), and the two south boards measure 30 ft (9 m) by 49 ft (15 m) (1,470 square feet).

== Concerts ==
Date	Artist	Opening act(s)	Tour / concert name	Attendance	Notes
April 22-23, 2023	Morgan Wallen (first night only)	4/22: Bailey Zimmerman, ERNEST, HARDY; 4/23: Nate Smith, ERNEST, HARDY	One Night At a Time World Tour	~60,000	First concert at the stadium. Second night Wallen did not perform due to lost voice and medical notice to not sing.
April 20, 2024	Morgan Wallen	Lauren Watkins, Nate Smith, Bailey Zimmerman	One Night At a Time World Tour	~60,000	Rescheduled from canceled concert the prior year.

== See also ==
- The Grove
- List of NCAA Division I FBS football stadiums
