= A. C. Crowder =

American politician (1868–1936)

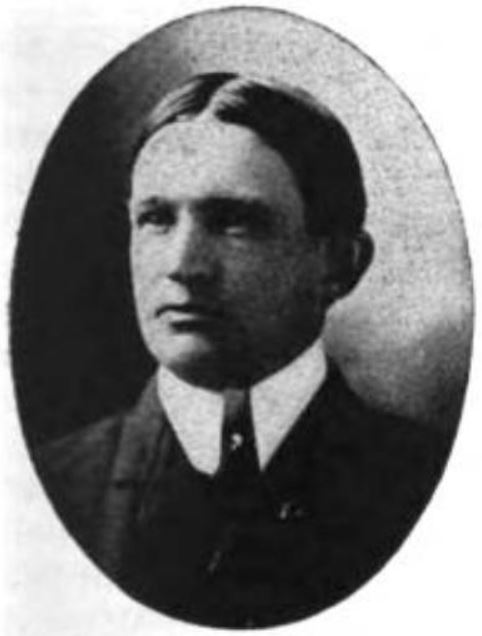
- c. 1906

Mayor of Jackson, Mississippi
- In office 1909–1913
- Preceded by: Ramsey Wharton
- Succeeded by: S. J. Taylor

Personal details
- Born: Arthur Campbell Crowder; July 16, 1868 Fluvanna County, Virginia
- Died: September 15, 1936 (aged 68) Birmingham, Alabama
- Party: Democrat
- Spouse: Mattie Saunders (m. 1899)
- Children: 1

Arthur Campbell Crowder, Sr. (July 16, 1868 – September 15, 1936) was the mayor of Jackson, Mississippi, from 1909 to 1913.

== Early life ==
Arthur Campbell Crowder was born on July 16, 1868, in Fluvanna County, Virginia, to John Meredith and Mary Boardman (Jones) Crowder. He was one of two sons. While an infant, his family moved to Huntsville, Alabama, where his father worked in the real estate and insurance business and operated a sawmill. His family moved to Birmingham, Alabama, in 1886. Crowder went to private schools. In 1889, he graduated from the Agricultural and Mechanical College at Alabama (now known as Auburn University), where he was affiliated with the fraternity Kappa Alpha Order. After graduating, he entered the insurance business.

== Political career ==
In 1898, Crowder moved to Jackson, Mississippi. He also served in many official positions there, including one term as alderman and two terms as president of the Cotton States Baseball League. He also served two terms as mayor of the city, from 1909 to 1913. He was the final mayor of Jackson in the aldermanic form of government. He was a Democrat. He returned to Birmingham in 1916.

== Later life ==
He became the Mississippi manager for the Prudential Life Insurance Company in 1902. After being promoted to manager of the Alabama and Mississippi section of the Prudential Life Insurance Company, he returned to Birmingham in 1916. He was the president of the Alabama Society of the Sons of the American Revolution from 1923 to 1924. He died in Birmingham, Alabama, on September 15, 1936.

== Personal life ==
In Jackson, Mississippi, he married Mattie Saunders, the daughter of Robert L. and Annie (Robinson) Saunders, on August 14, 1899. They had one son, Arthur Campbell Crowder, Junior. He was a member of the Masonic Order.
