= Fred Shanks =

American politician

Member of the Mississippi House of Representatives from the 60th district
- Incumbent
- Assumed office March 19, 2018

Personal details
- Born: December 26, 1977 (age 48) Flowood, Mississippi, U.S.
- Party: Republican
- Parent: Doug Shanks (father)

Fred D. Shanks (born December 26, 1977) is an American politician serving as a member of the Mississippi House of Representatives from the 60th district. He assumed office on March 19, 2018.

== Early life and education ==
Shanks was born in Flowood, Mississippi He was the son of Jackson Republican mayoral candidate and college baseball coach Doug Shanks (1946-2023). He graduated from University Christian School (now Hartfield Academy). He also attended Hinds Community College and Mississippi State University.

== Career ==
Shanks previously worked at Brandon Discount Drugs. He later served as a reserve police officer for Brandon, Mississippi and as a member of the Brandon Board of Aldermen. He was elected to the Mississippi House of Representatives in March 2018. He serves as chair of the House Constitution Committee.
