= Walter A. Scott =

American politician

Mayor of Jackson, Mississippi
- In office 1917–1945
- Preceded by: S. J. Taylor
- Succeeded by: Leland Speed

Personal details
- Born: November 20, 1876 Rolling Fork, Mississippi, US
- Died: June 28, 1963 (aged 86) Jackson, Mississippi, US
- Party: Democratic

Walter Augustus Scott (November 20, 1876 – June 28, 1963) was the mayor of Jackson, Mississippi, from 1917 to 1945.

== Biography ==
Scott was born on November 20, 1876, in Rolling Fork, Mississippi. He attended high school in Crystal Springs, Mississippi. He then managed a hardware store in Yazoo City. He moved to Jackson, Mississippi, in 1908, after accepting a position in a hardware store there. He became the mayor of Jackson, Mississippi, in 1917. When he was first inaugurated in 1917, he was Jackson's first mayor under the commission form of government. Scott served seven terms in office, his last term, after running without opposition, starting in 1941. He ran in the 1944 election for mayor against Leland Speed and lost, ending his tenure as mayor in 1945. He died on June 28, 1963, in Jackson, Mississippi.

== See also ==
- List of longest-serving United States mayors
