= Robert Stafford Curry =

American politician

Member of the Mississippi House of Representatives from the Hinds County district
- In office 1922 – January 1924
- Preceded by: William Hemingway

Personal details
- Born: August 1, 1862 Carrollton, Alabama, U.S.
- Party: Democratic

Robert Stafford Curry was an American politician. He was a Democratic member of the Mississippi House of Representatives from 1922 to 1924.

== Biography ==
Robert Stafford Curry was born on August 1, 1862, in Carrollton, Pickens County, Alabama, the son of John Madison Curry and Lucy (Chapman) Curry. He married Williametta Lipsey in 1885. He practiced medicine by career. He was elected to the Mississippi House of Representatives, representing Hinds County, in 1920 to succeed resigning member William Hemingway and served in the last (1922) session of the term. He was a Democrat.
