= John E. Aldridge =

20th-century Florida state senator

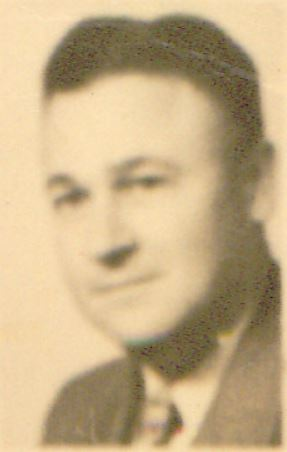
- 1948

Member of the Mississippi House of Representatives for Montgomery and Grenada counties
- In office January 1948 – January 1952
- Preceded by: William A. Winter
- Succeeded by: William O. Semmes
- In office January 1940 – January 1944
- Preceded by: James H. Bull
- Succeeded by: William A. Winter

Member of the Mississippi State Senate from the 26th district
- In office January 1944 – January 1948
- Preceded by: Vernon F. Anderson
- Succeeded by: Dave Fullilove

Personal details
- Born: John Edward Aldridge; September 21, 1912 Winona, Mississippi, U.S.
- Died: April 22, 2007 (aged 94)
- Party: Democratic
- Children: 3, including Ron

John Edward Aldridge Sr. (September 21, 1912 – April 22, 2007) was an American lawyer and Democratic politician from Winona, Mississippi.

== Early life and education ==
John Edward Aldridge was born in Winona, Mississippi on September 21, 1912 to Hendrix and Cammie Aldridge, and he was the seventh of nine children. His father Hendrix served in the Mississippi House of Representatives from 1924 to 1932. Aldridge attended Winona Highschool graduating in 1930. He then attended the University of Mississippi graduating with a BA in 1934, a year later he earned a Bachelors of Law degree. During his time at Ole Miss he was a brother of Pi Kappa Alpha. Aldridge finished his schooling at the University of Texas with a post-graduate study of law in 1936. He then moved back to Winona and opened a law practice. A year later he married his wife Jean Aldridge on New Year's Eve, and they had 3 children together Dr. John Aldridge Jr, Franklin Aldridge, and Ronald Aldridge.

== Career ==
Aldridge had a long career in Mississippi politics starting in 1937 when he was a member of the Montgomery County Election Commission. In 1939 he was elected as a State Representative from Montgomery and served one term. He was then elected to the State Senate in 1943 for another term, representing the 26th District. After his Senate stint he was elected to the State House once again in 1947 where he served his last of three terms in the State Legislature. In 1950, he was elected as the District Attorney of the Fifth Judicial District in a special election, after which he was reelected twice.

After his time in the legislature Aldridge was still an active participant in the Mississippi government. In 1951 he was elected as the State Commander of Mississippi Department of the Veterans of Foreign Wars for one year. In 1960 he was appointed as the Executive Director of the Mississippi Employment Security Commission which he served as for 18 years under 5 different governors. And in 1984 he helped to organize the Mississippi Retired Public Employee's Association which helped to pass a constitutional amendment in Mississippi that protected the state retiree trust fund.
