= Ron Aldridge (politician) =

American lawyer and politician

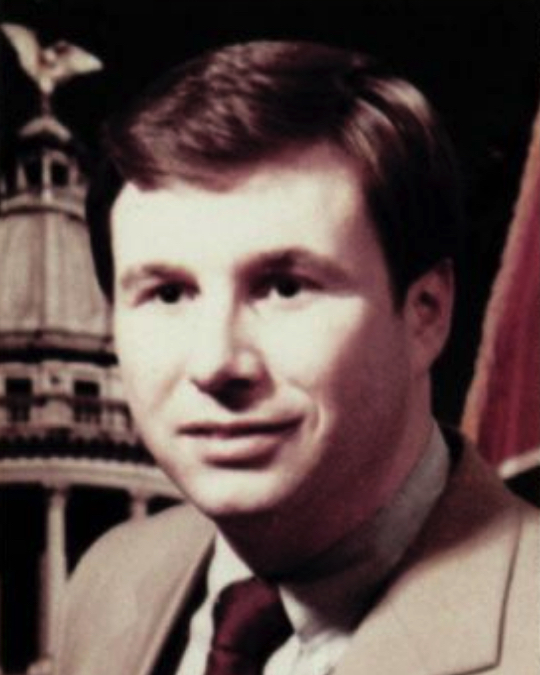
- Official portrait of Aldridge, 1984

Member of the Mississippi House of Representatives from the 66th district
- In office January 3, 1984 – January 5, 1988
- Preceded by: John H. Stennis
- Succeeded by: J. Kane Ditto

Personal details
- Born: Ronald Hugh Aldridge; October 31, 1950 (age 75) Winona, Mississippi, U.S.
- Party: Republican
- Spouse: Beth Buckley
- Parent: John E. Aldridge (father)
- Education: University of Mississippi

Military service
- Branch/service: United States Army
- Years of service: 1975–1997
- Rank: Major
- Unit: MS Army National Guard; U.S. Army Reserve

Ronald Hugh Aldridge (born October 31, 1950) is an American lawyer and politician who served one term in the Mississippi House of Representatives. In 1987, he lost his bid for reelection to Democrat J. Kane Ditto. He served as Mississippi state director of the National Federation of Independent Business from 1989 to 1992 and from 1998 to 2020.

His parents were John E. Aldridge (1912–2007), who represented Montgomery County in both houses of the Mississippi Legislature between 1940 and 1952, and his wife, Jean Butt Aldridge (1918–2007), who served on the State Board of Ladies' Staffs of three Governors of Mississippi: Ross Barnett, Paul Johnson Jr., and William Waller. His paternal grandfather, Charles Hendrix Aldridge (1876-1954), served in the Mississippi House of Representatives (also representing Montgomery County) from 1924 to 1932.

Mississippi House of Representatives
Preceded by John H. Stennis	Mississippi Representative from the 66th District; 1984–1988	Succeeded by J. Kane Ditto
