= Wilbur Fisk Hyer =

American politician

Member of the Mississippi Senate from the 25th district
- In office January 3, 1882 – January 5, 1886
- Succeeded by: George M. Batchelor

Member of the Mississippi House of Representatives from the Marshall County district
- In office 1872–1873

Personal details
- Born: March 24, 1839 Somerville, Tennessee
- Died: November 18, 1897 (aged 58) Meridian, Mississippi

Wilbur Fisk Hyer (March 24, 1839 – November 18, 1897) was an American politician, physician, and Mississippi state legislator in the 1870s and 1880s.

== Biography ==
Wilbur Fisk Hyer was born on March 24, 1839, in Summerville, Tennessee. He was the son of William Hyer, a Tennessee Methodist minister, and Grace (Tobey) Hyrer. He represented Marshall County in the Mississippi House of Representatives in the 1872 and 1873 sessions. He represented the 25th district in the Mississippi State Senate from 1882 to 1886. From 1880 to 1881 he was the president of the Mississippi Board of Health. He was found dead in his bed on the morning of November 18, 1897, in Meridian, Mississippi. He was about 60 years old.

== Personal life ==
In 1861, Hyer married Elizabeth Bowen, who was a native of Mississippi. They had six children. Their daughter, Grace, married politician William Hemingway in 1901. Hemingway was a mayor of Jackson, Mississippi, and a member of the Mississippi State Senate in the 1920 session.
