= Katherine Ettl =

American sculptor

Katherine Willis Rhymes Speed Ettl
- Born: Katherine Rhymes; April 7, 1911; Georgetown, Mississippi, U.S.
- Died: January 10, 1993 (aged 81); Jackson, Mississippi, U.S.
- Resting place: Lakewood Memorial Park, Jackson, Mississippi, U.S.
- Occupation: Sculptor
- Spouse(s): Leland Speed (m. 1931–1971, his death); Alex John Ettl
- Children: 4 sons, 1 daughter
- Parent(s): Cassius Douglas Rhymes and Shellie Lee Stewart Rhymes
- Relatives: Doulas Rhymes, Sarah Rhymes Flannes, Lucille Rhymes Everett, Ann Rhymes Navarro, Lynda Rhymes Clay

Katherine Rhymes Speed Ettl (April 7, 1911 – January 10, 1993) was an American sculptor. She designed many bronze statues, including the one of President Andrew Jackson outside the Jackson City Hall.

== Life ==
Ettl was born on April 7, 1911, in Georgetown, Mississippi, the daughter of C. Douglas Rhymes and Shellie Lee Stewart Rhymes.

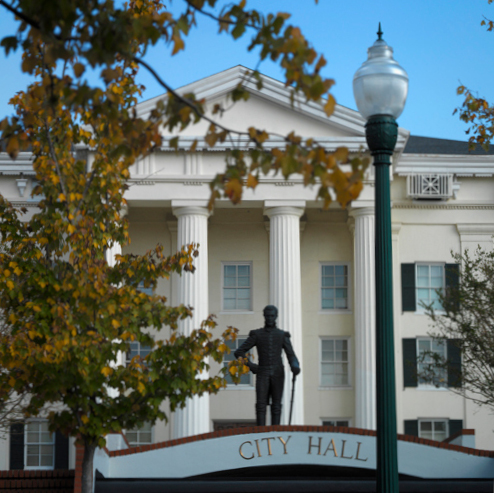
Statue of President Andrew Jackson, designed by Ettl.

Ettl designed many bronze statues, including the one of President Andrew Jackson outside the Jackson City Hall. She also designed statues of the Kansas City Chiefs for the Arrowhead Stadium, and Confederate President Jefferson Davis for the National Guard Headquarters in Washington, D.C.

Ettl was married twice. Her first husband, Leland Speed, whom she married in 1931, served as the mayor of Jackson from 1945 to 1949. One of their children, Lake, became a stock car racing driver. After Leland's death in 1971, she married Alex John Ettl, and she resided in Princeton, New Jersey from 1972 to 1992. She died of cancer on January 10, 1993, in Jackson, Mississippi, and she was buried in Lakewood Memorial Park with her husband Leland Speed and their infant son James Speed.
