= Dale Danks =

American politician (1939–2021)

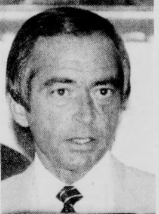

Mayor of Jackson, Mississippi
- In office 1977–1989
- Preceded by: Russell C. Davis
- Succeeded by: J. Kane Ditto

Personal details
- Born: Alney Dale Danks Jr. August 27, 1939 Miami, Florida, U.S.
- Died: June 9, 2021 (aged 81) Jackson, Mississippi, U.S.
- Party: Republican (1995–2021)
- Other political affiliations: Democratic (until 1995)
- Parent(s): Alney Dale Danks Sr. Elizabeth Ross Banks

Alney Dale Danks Jr. (August 27, 1939 – June 9, 2021) was an American attorney who served as the mayor of Jackson, Mississippi, from 1977 to 1989.

== Biography ==
Alney Dale Danks Jr. was born on August 27, 1939, in Miami, Florida, to Alney Dale Danks Sr. and Elizabeth Ross. When Danks was 3, his family moved to Alabama. In 1954, his family moved to Jackson, Mississippi. He graduated from Murrah High School and enrolled in Millsaps College in 1957. In June 1959, he dropped out of Millsaps College and married Carolyn Carl. In 1963, he graduated law school at the Jackson School of Law and was admitted to the bar.

== Political career ==
In 1965, Danks first ran for city commissioner as a Republican and lost. He ran for becoming the Hinds County prosecutor in 1968 and lost. He won the election to become the Hinds County prosecutor in 1972. In 1977, he ran for the mayor office of Jackson, Mississippi as a Democrat, beating Republican candidate Doug Shanks. He won re-election in 1981. Starting in 1985, he became the first mayor of the city under mayor-council form. Danks stopped being the mayor of Jackson in 1989, when he lost in a runoff election to J. Kane Ditto.

== Later life ==
He returned to practicing law. After 1989, he was appointed as a municipal judge in Madison, Mississippi. In 2004, he formed a law firm with attorney Michael Cory, named "Danks, Miller & Cory". In 2005, he served on the transition team of mayor Frank Melton.

Danks died of complications from a stroke on June 9, 2021.
