= S. J. Taylor =

American politician

Swepson James Taylor

Mayor of Jackson, Mississippi
- In office 1913–1917
- Preceded by: A. C. Crowder
- Succeeded by: Walter A. Scott

Personal details
- Born: May 11, 1862 Alabama
- Died: April 25, 1947 (aged 84)
- Party: Democratic

Swepson James Taylor (May 11, 1862 - April 25, 1947) was the mayor of Jackson, Mississippi, from 1913 to 1917.

== Biography ==
Taylor was born on May 11, 1862, in Alabama. He married Louise Blum Smith in 1889.
