= William I. S. Thompson =

American politician (1936–1993)

Member of the Mississippi House of Representatives from the Hinds County district
- In office January 1964 – January 1968

Personal details
- Born: November 24, 1936 Jackson, Mississippi
- Died: November 24, 1993 (aged 57) Madison County, Mississippi
- Parent: Allen C. Thompson (father)

William Isaac Shelby Thompson (November 24, 1936 - November 24, 1993) was a member of the Mississippi House of Representatives for Hinds County from 1964 to 1968.

== Biography ==
William Isaac Shelby Thompson was born on November 24, 1936, in Jackson, Mississippi. He was the son of Jackson mayor and Mississippi legislator Allen C. Thompson. He graduated from Central High School, the University of Mississippi, and Millsaps College. He was a life insurance salesman. He also was a pilot and flight instructor. In 1964, he was inaugurated to the Mississippi House of Representatives as one of the Hinds County representatives. His term ended in 1968. He died on November 24, 1993, when his single-engine airplane crashed near Bruce Campbell Field in Madison County, Mississippi.
