= J. Kane Ditto =

American politician

John Kane Ditto
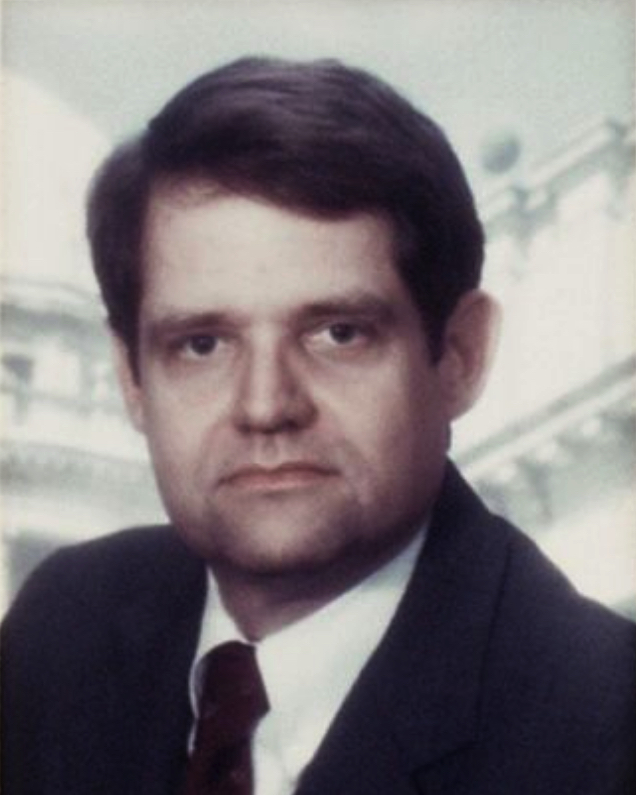

Mayor of Jackson, Mississippi
- In office July 3, 1989 – July 7, 1997
- Preceded by: Dale Danks
- Succeeded by: Harvey Johnson Jr.

Member of the Mississippi House of Representatives from the 66th district
- In office January 5, 1988 – July 3, 1989
- Preceded by: Ron Aldridge
- Succeeded by: Mike Gunn

Personal details
- Born: John Kane Ditto; May 18, 1944 (age 82) Bowling Green, Kentucky, U.S.
- Party: Democratic
- Education: Duke University (AB); Vanderbilt University JD)

John Kane Ditto (born May 18, 1944) is an American politician and formerly the mayor of Jackson, Mississippi. He was born in Bowling Green, Kentucky.

Ditto, a Democrat, served as Mayor of the City of Jackson from July 3, 1989 until July 1997. Ditto was previously elected to the Mississippi House of Representatives from District 66, where he served from 1987 to 1989. Before entering the political arena, Ditto practiced law for 18 years with Watkins Ludlam Winter & Stennis in Jackson. For five years he was managing partner of the firm. As a practicing attorney, his practice developed a heavy emphasis in municipal finance.

Ditto proposed a new African studies institute that would foster trade and academic exchange with the continent. Ditto pushed minority-owned and small business venture financing investigations and efforts to expand medical and data-processing facilities near downtown. He wanted a spacious convention center downtown and the re-opening of Lake Hico to citizens for recreation.

On May 25, 2012, he participated in a focus group as part of the needs assessment process of the Restorative Care Hospital and the Mississippi Baptist Medical Center by meeting with other community leaders who had direct knowledge of the health service needs of disadvantaged populations in the Jackson metropolitan area.

== Personal life ==
Ditto is married to Betsy Ditto. The couple have four children, including Raymond Ditto, President and CEO of Ditto Residential, an award-winning development firm based in Washington, DC. They have nine grandchildren. Ditto attended Duke University for undergraduate studies and received a Juris Doctor degree from Vanderbilt University.

Preceded by Dale Danks	Mayor of Jackson, MS; 1989–1997	Succeeded by Harvey Johnson Jr.
