= The Oaks House Museum =

Historic house in Mississippi, United States

- Oaks, The
- U.S. National Register of Historic Places
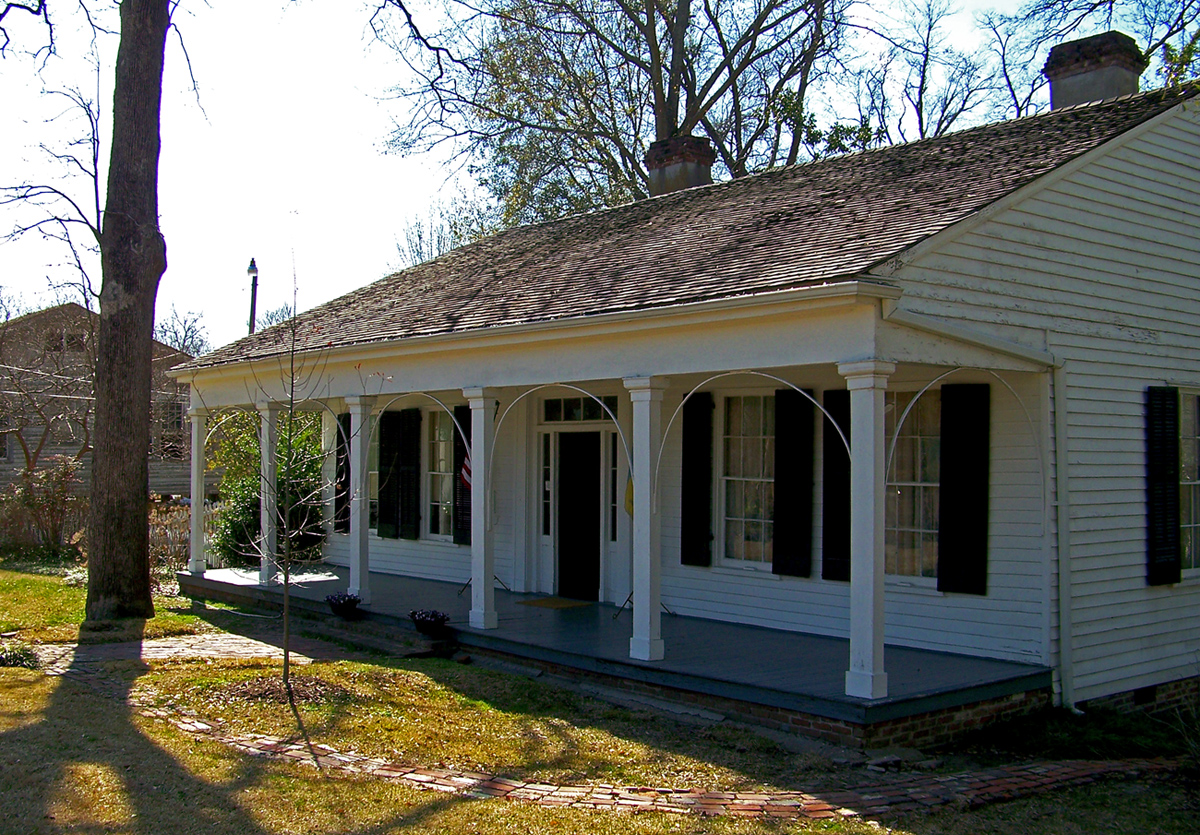
- Oaks House and Museum

- Location within Mississippi Location within the United States
- Location: 823 N. Jefferson St., Jackson, Mississippi
- Coordinates: 32°18′32″N 90°10′34″W
- Area: 1 acre (0.40 ha)
- Built: 1856
- Architectural style: Greek Revival
- NRHP reference No.: 73001015
- Added to NRHP: May 25, 1973

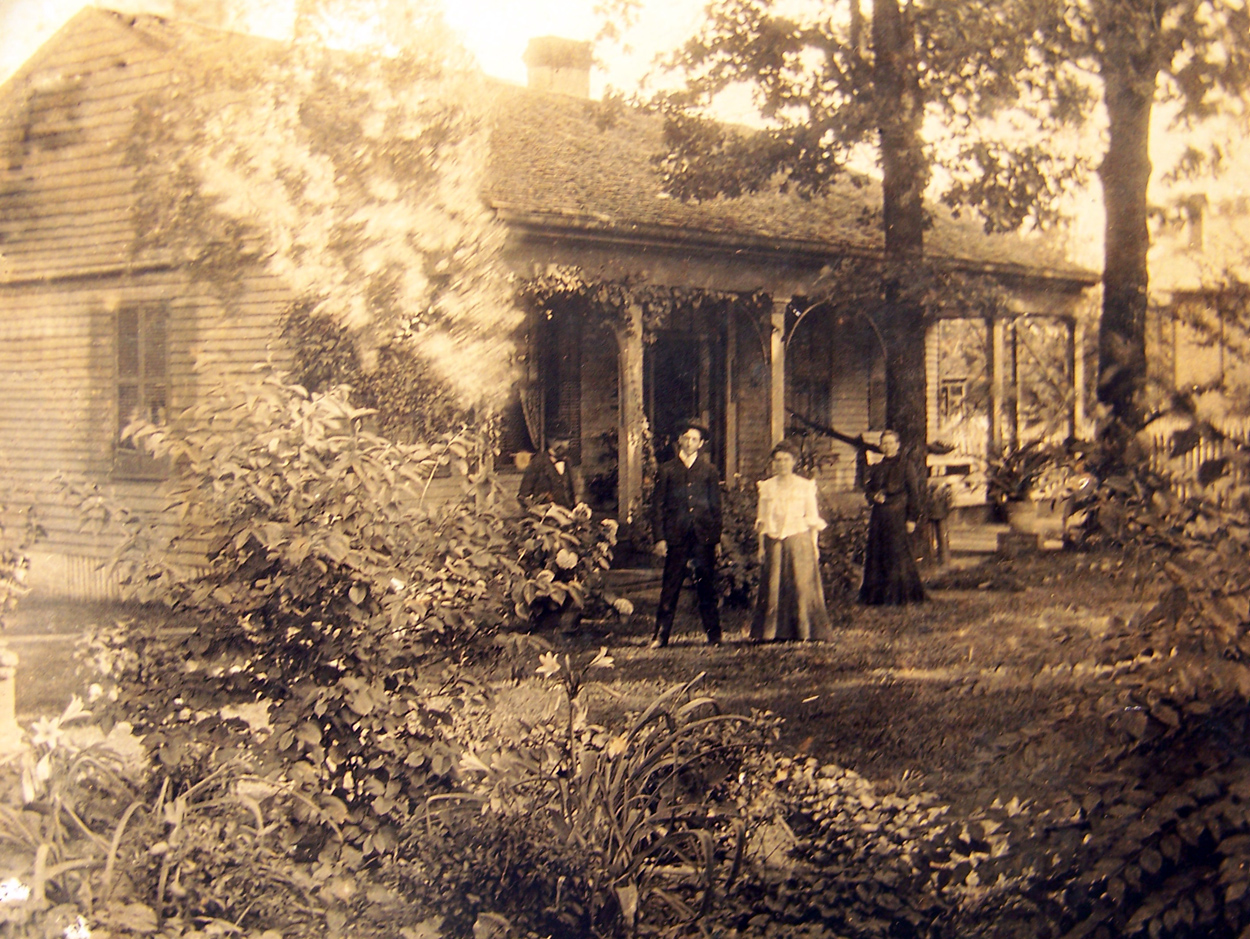
The Oaks in a photograph from the 19th century

The Oaks House Museum, also known as The Oaks, located at 823 North Jefferson Street in Jackson, Mississippi, is the former home of Jackson Mayor James H. Boyd (1809–77) and his wife Eliza Ellis Boyd and their family. Having survived the burning of Jackson during the Civil War, The Oaks is one of the oldest structures in the city. It is listed on the National Register of Historic Places and is a Mississippi Landmark.

The structure was built in the Greek Revival style in approximately 1853. The original property was larger than the current one, at one time encompassing 4 acres (16,000 m^{2}) and extending north to Boyd Street and west to North Street, an urban farmstead with main house, barn, detached kitchen, smokehouse, greenhouse, and other outbuildings. Three generations of the Boyd family lived at The Oaks, from 1853 until 1960. Mrs. Eliza Ellis Boyd outlived her husband by many years and lived in the house until her death in 1902. Daughter Mary and her husband, Richard F. McGill, lived in the house with their two children. In 1960, the grandchildren sold the property to The National Society of the Colonial Dames of America in the State of Mississippi (NSCDA-MS).

The home is now a historic house museum administered by the Oaks House Museum Corporation.
