= John H. Stennis =

American lawyer and politician

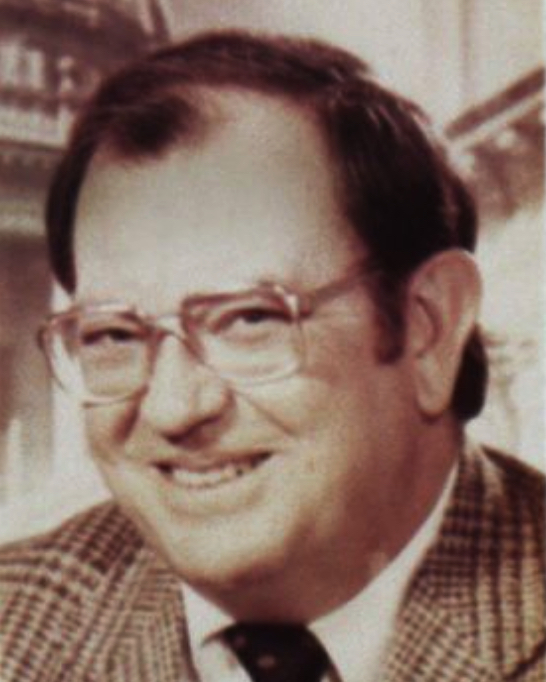
- Official portrait, 1980

Member of the Mississippi House of Representatives from the 66th district
- In office July 22, 1969 – January 3, 1984
- Preceded by: Russell C. Davis
- Succeeded by: Ron Aldridge

Personal details
- Born: John Hampton Stennis; March 2, 1935 De Kalb, Mississippi, U.S.
- Died: September 5, 2013 (aged 78) Jackson, Mississippi, U.S.
- Party: Democratic
- Spouse: Martha Rozelle Allred (m. 1966; died 1997)
- Children: 2
- Parent: John C. Stennis (father)
- Education: Princeton University (AB); University of Virginia (JD)

Military service
- Branch/service: United States Air Force
- Years of service: 1960–1990
- Rank: Brigadier general
- Unit: MS Air National Guard

John Hampton Stennis (March 2, 1935 – September 5, 2013) was an American lawyer and Democratic politician who served as a member of the Mississippi House of Representatives. The son of U.S. Senator John C. Stennis, he was first elected in 1969 to succeed Russell C. Davis, who was elected mayor of Jackson. In 1978, he ran for Congress in Mississippi's 4th congressional district but lost to Jon Hinson.

On September 17, 1966, he was married to the former Martha Rozelle Allred at the Presbyterian church in Collins, Mississippi.

Mississippi House of Representatives
| Preceded by Russell C. Davis | Mississippi Representative from the 66th District; 1969–1984 | Succeeded by Ron Aldridge |
