= Manship House (Jackson, Mississippi) =

Historic house in Mississippi, United States

- U.S. National Register of Historic Places
- Mississippi Landmark
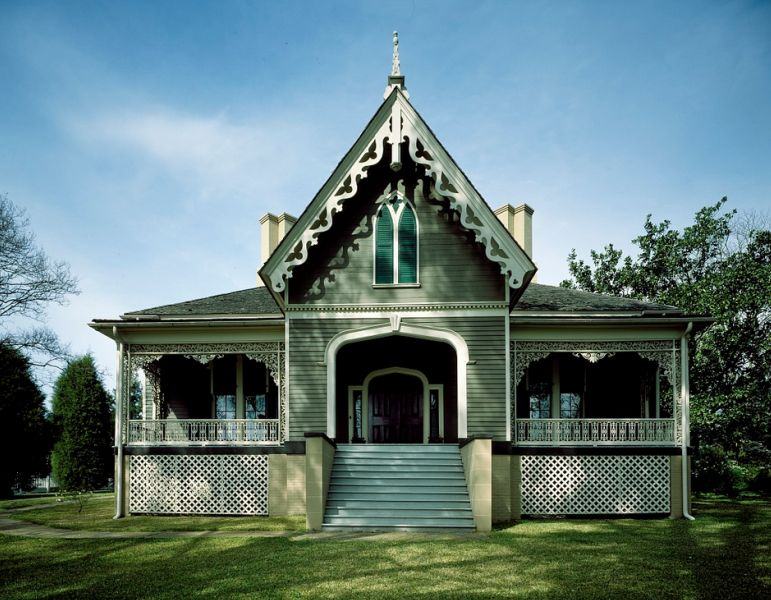
- Front Facade

- Location within Mississippi Location within the United States
- Location: 412 East Fortification Street Jackson, Mississippi
- Coordinates: 32°18′45″N 90°10′53″W
- Area: 4 acres (1.6 ha)
- Built: 1857
- Architectural style: Gothic Revival
- NRHP reference No.: 72000693
- USMS No.: 049-JAC-0951-NR-ML

Significant dates
- Added to NRHP: October 18, 1972
- Designated USMS: January 15, 1986

The Manship House is a historic residence in Jackson, Mississippi. It was added to the National Register of Historic Places in 1972, and was designated a Mississippi Landmark in 1986.

== History ==
In 1836, Charles Henry Manship moved from Maryland to Jackson, Mississippi, where he became a prominent businessman, civic leader, and mayor during the American Civil War. By 1838, Manship had married Adeline Daley, daughter of David Daley, who was contractor for the Mississippi State Capitol during its construction in the 1830s.

=== Description ===
Completed in 1857, the Manship House served as the family home of Charles Manship, his wife, and their fifteen children. The house was constructed as a one-story, wood-frame structure in "Gothic Revival" architectural style on a four acre lot. The interior of the house consisted of a main block with a central hallway, flanked by two rooms on each side. An ell incorporated a dining room and sitting room. Three chimneys projected from the hipped roof, and ceilings in all rooms extended to 16 feet (4.9 m). The west elevation included a 50 ft (15 m) porch, with an enclosed central bay.

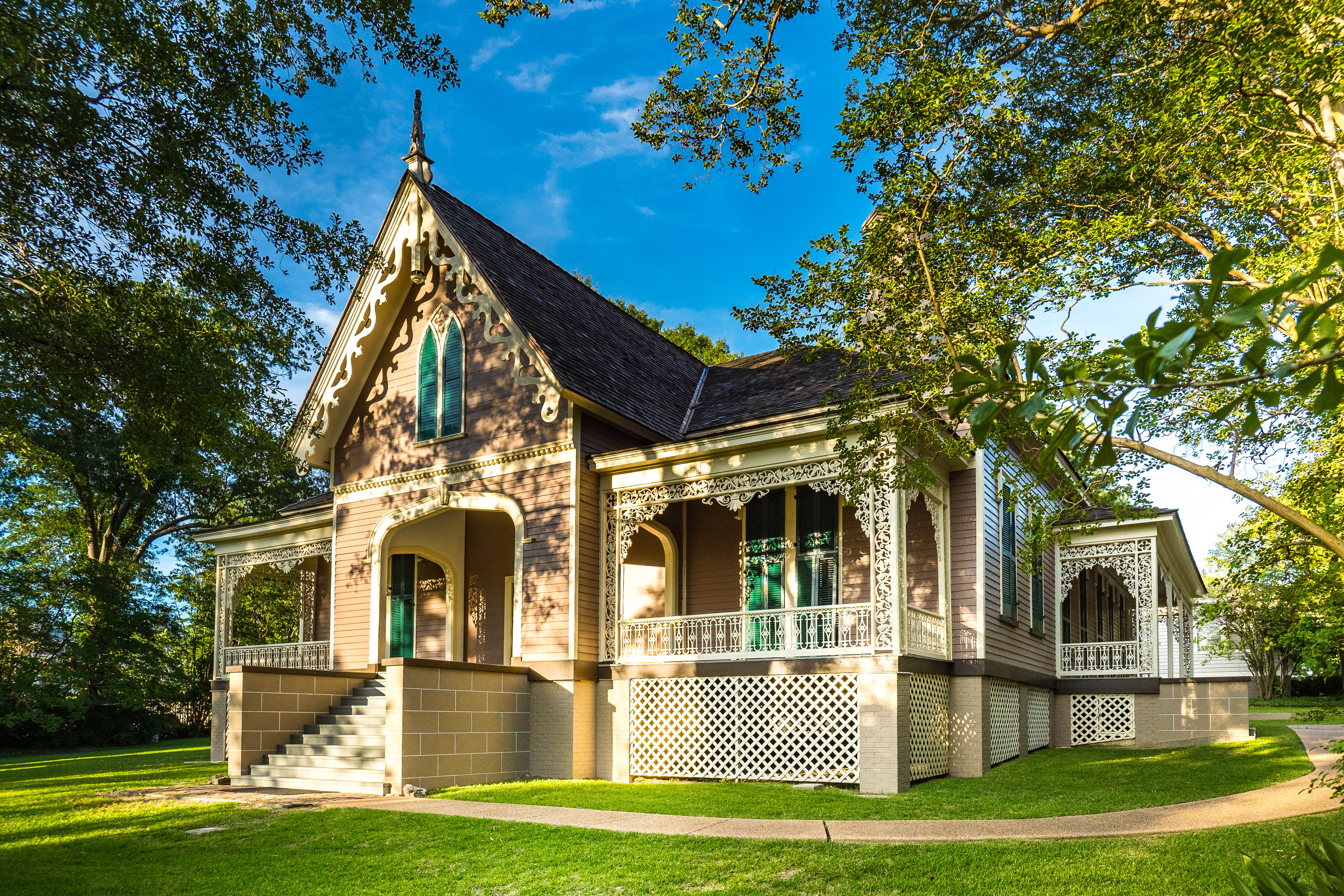
The Manship House in Recent Years [photo taken in 2019]

In 1937, the Manship House was the site of the last reunion of Confederate veterans in Mississippi. The house was occupied continuously by members of the Manship family from 1857 until 1975, when it was acquired by the state of Mississippi to serve as a museum.

=== Museum ===
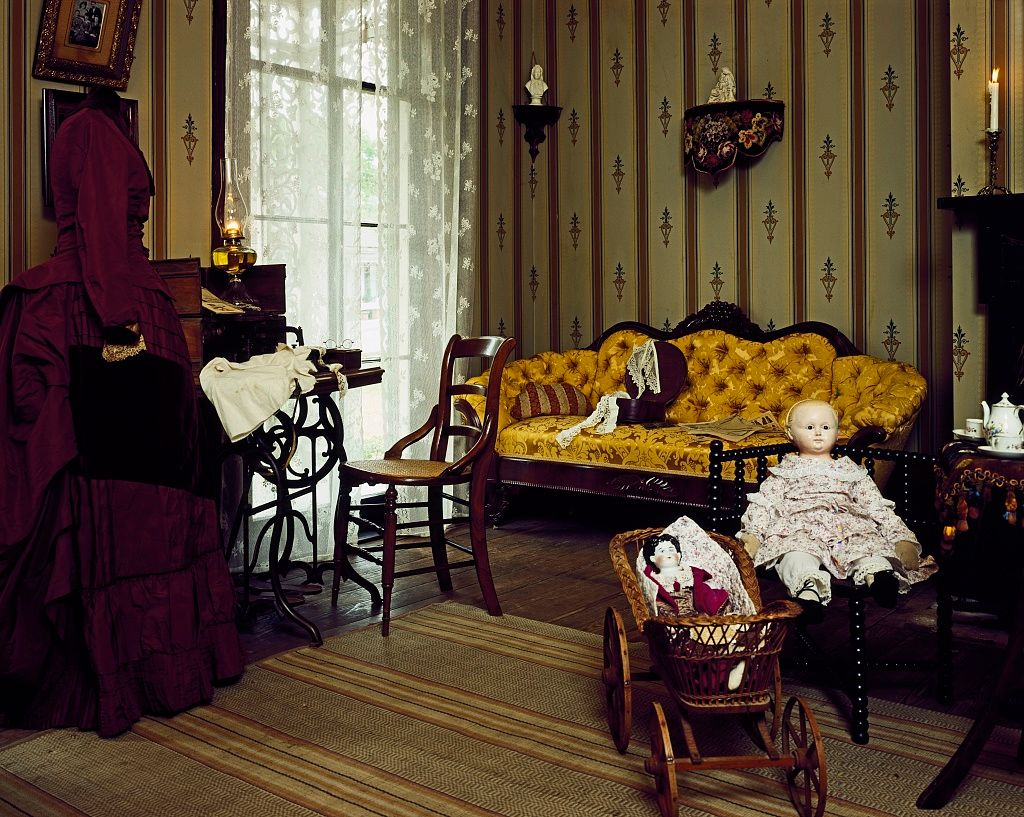
Room at Manship House

Between 1976 and 1980, renovation and restoration work on the Manship House was administered by the Mississippi Department of Archives and History. The building was restored to represent a middle-class southern home, as it might have appeared in 1888.

As of February 2015, the Manship House Museum was closed while undergoing additional restoration and repairs of the building's foundation.
