= Allen C. Thompson =

American politician

- Thompson pictured in Ole Miss 1929, Mississippi yearbook

Mayor of Jackson, Mississippi
- In office 1948–1969
- Preceded by: Leland S. Speed
- Succeeded by: Russell C. Davis

27th President of the National League of Cities
- In office 1955
- Preceded by: William E. Kemp
- Succeeded by: Robert F. Wagner Jr.

Member of the Mississippi House of Representatives from the Hinds County district
- In office 1940–1942

Personal details
- Born: Allen Cavett Thompson; November 6, 1906 Jackson, Mississippi, U.S.
- Died: October 18, 1980 (aged 73) St. Augustine, Florida, U.S.
- Party: Democratic
- Spouse: Evana Shelby
- Children: Allen Thompson, Jr. Shelby Thompson; William I. S. Thompson
- Education: University of Mississippi

Military service
- Allegiance: United States
- Branch/service: United States Navy
- Battles/wars: World War II

Allen Cavett Thompson (November 6, 1906 – October 18, 1980) was an American politician in the state of Mississippi. Affiliated with the Democratic Party, he served in the Mississippi House of Representatives and as mayor of Jackson, Mississippi.

== Early life ==
Thompson was born to Allen and Mattie Thompson. His father was an attorney, city prosecutor and city judge prior to his death in 1916. Allen, his brother, and mother all had to work to help support the family. Upon graduating from Central High School, Allen enrolled at the University of Mississippi.

Thompson married Evana Shelby on August 22, 1929, in Port Gibson, Mississippi. He was offered and accepted a teaching position at Blue Mountain College in North Mississippi.

== Career ==
In 1931, Allen obtained his license to practice law and returned to Jackson. During the next few years, Allen and Evana had three children, Allen Jr., Shelby, and William I.S. "Billy" Thompson.

Thompson began his career in politics when he was elected to the Mississippi House of Representatives in 1940. He served until he resigned to join the United States Navy in 1942. He attained the rank of Lieutenant Commander and was assigned to Naval Intelligence. He was honorably discharged on January 14, 1946, at which time he returned to Jackson and resumed his law practice.

Soon after his return, he was appointed by Governor Bailey to be legislative liaison to the Governor. During this time, he became President of the Junior Chamber of Commerce, President of the Exchange Club, State Excise Tax Commissioner, and served on the board of Stewards at Galloway Methodist Church.

In 1948, Thompson, a Democrat, was elected mayor of the city of Jackson. During Thompson's tenure as mayor, the city's population grew from 98,000 to 154,000 and its facilities expanded to serve the larger population.

He was also elected twice as President of the American Municipal Association. He was the United States Southern Representative to the International Union of Cities, which was held in Brighton, England where 350 cities and 30 nations were represented. In 1955, Thompson served as the president of the National League of Cities.

=== Opposition to Civil Rights Movement ===
As mayor, Thompson refused to integrate public recreational facilities in Jackson. Instead, he closed many city facilities, some of which remained closed for years. In 1963, Thompson closed four of the city's five public swimming pools and transferred the fifth to the YMCA, which continued to operate it for whites only. Thompson made public statements indicating his dedication to maintaining segregated facilities. Although this was challenged in the courts, the city's right to close the pools was affirmed by each court, including the Supreme Court.

He was a member of the Citizens' Council, a white supremacist group. Thompson purchased an International Harvester Loadstar 1600 and outfitted it in paramilitary gear in order to assault Civil Rights activists. The device was colloquially known as "Thompson's Tank."

On May 12, 1963, Civil Rights activist Medgar Evers sent out letters to city officials in Jackson stating the NAACP's goal of integration in Jackson and the four goals of the boycott of downtown Jackson (which had begun the previous year): hiring and promotion equality, integration of public spaces, use of courtesy titles towards black peers (such as Mrs., Miss, and Mr.) and service on a first-come, first-served basis.

In response, Mayor Allen Thompson went on television the next day to portray Jackson as a city without racial inequality, characterizing the NAACP as outside agitators. After gaining permission from the Federal Communications Commission (FCC), Evers, a Jackson native, gave a reply to the mayor's speech on public television on May 20.

On May 27, 1963, Thompson met with representatives from the civil rights movement. The representatives laid out eight goals: form a biracial committee; desegregate all public facilities, including parks, playgrounds and libraries; eventually desegregate all public schools; remove segregation signs from all public places; desegregate lunchrooms and lunch counters in downtown stores; upgrade the salaries of black municipal workers; employ black crossing guards for school zones; and hire blacks on the city police force.

Thompson agreed to the latter two goals only. The campaigners already expected that the mayor would not agree to most goals, and upon hearing his answer, walked out. Protests, marches and sit-ins continued. On June 4, Mayor Thompson declared the campaign finished. Medgar Evers and other activists continued to lead small protests throughout Jackson that day, ending with a pray-in at City Hall. On June 7, 1963, Mayor Thompson effectively issued an injunction to the NAACP, CORE, and Tougaloo College faculty by banning parades and mass demonstrations without a permit. On Friday, June 7, the coalition's strategy committee ignored the injunction and continued the blitzkrieg, with dozens of demonstrators arrested. That night, singer Lena Horne and black comedian Dick Gregory came to Jackson to host a benefit concert attended by most of black community in Jackson. On Sunday, demonstrators staged pray-ins at five white churches. Only one white congregation let the demonstrators pray without interruption. Meanwhile, the appeal to the injunction found the Mississippi state court siding with Mayor.

On Wednesday, June 12, 1963, just after midnight, a gunman killed Medgar Evers as he left his car. Under pressure from President John F. Kennedy, Thompson agreed to three of the eight civil rights goals (hiring black policemen, upgrading black municipal worker salaries, and employing black crossing guards for school zones). Civil Rights Movement representatives accepted the terms and ended the direct action campaign on June 18, 1963.

== Retirement and later life ==
Thompson announced his retirement in 1969, and died of a heart attack in October 1980.
