= Russell C. Davis (politician) =

American politician

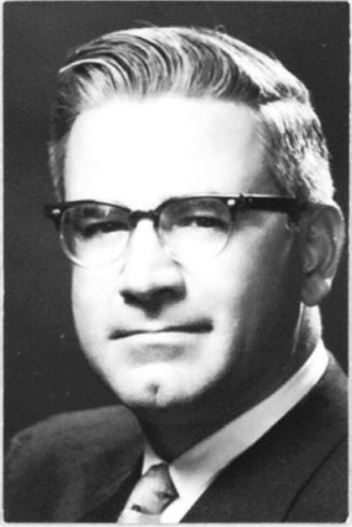
- Davis c. 1960

Mayor of Jackson, Mississippi
- In office July 1969 – 1977
- Preceded by: Allen C. Thompson
- Succeeded by: Dale Danks

Member of the Mississippi House of Representatives from the Hinds County district
- In office January 1960 – July 1969
- Succeeded by: John H. Stennis

Personal details
- Born: Russell Carlos Davis; August 13, 1922 Rockville, Maryland, U.S.
- Died: October 16, 1993 (aged 71) Jackson, Mississippi, U.S.
- Resting place: Jackson, MS
- Party: Democratic
- Spouse: Catherine Pullen (m. 1944)
- Children: 3

Military service
- Allegiance: United States
- Branch/service: United States Army
- Unit: United States Army Air Corps
- Battles/wars: World War II

Russell Carlos Davis (August 13, 1922 – October 16, 1993) was an American politician and the mayor of Jackson, Mississippi, from 1969 to 1977. He was a Democrat.

== Early life ==
Russell Carlos Davis was born on August 13, 1922, in Rockville, Maryland, to Roy E. Davis, a landscaper. Davis had one sister, who was named Mara Maude. Russell Davis attended and graduated from Richard Montgomery High School in Rockville, Maryland. He started attending the University of Maryland at the age of 16, but his college career was cut short by World War II. During World War II, he enlisted in the Army Air Corps and was stationed in Jackson, Mississippi, in 1944. He was a lieutenant by the time he married Catherine Pullen while there, on June 14, 1944. He worked in the insurance agency of his father-in-law, William H. Pullen.

== Political career ==
He was elected to the Mississippi House of Representatives in 1959, representing Hinds County. He ran three times: first term unopposed, second opposed, and third unopposed, and served from 1960 until becoming the mayor of Jackson. He became the mayor of Jackson on July 7, 1969, succeeding longtime mayor Allen Thompson. The Jackson State killings also occurred during his tenure in 1970. Also during his tenure as mayor, he presented the idea for a planetarium, which started construction in 1976 and is named after him. He was an early advocate of moving from the mayor-commissioner form of government to the mayor-council form. Mayor-council form was initiated after 1985. He stopped being mayor in 1977. In 1981, he tried running for a third term, but lost the nomination bid to Dale Danks. He died of cancer on October 16, 1993.
