= Lake Hico =

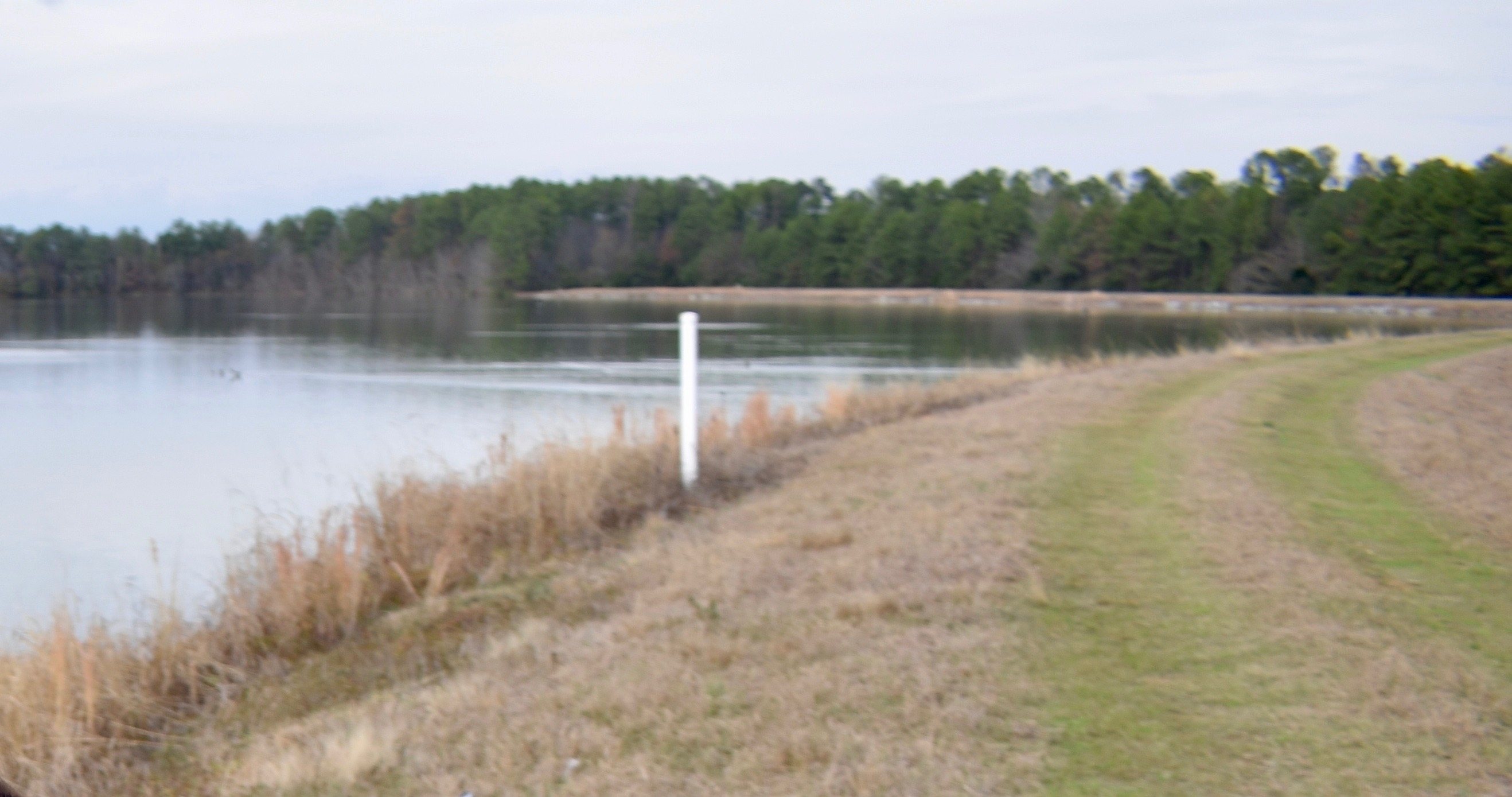
- Lake Hico dam looking NE

- Location within Mississippi Location within the United States
- Location: Jackson, Mississippi
- Coordinates: 32°21′47″N 90°12′24″W
- Type: cooling pond reservoir
- Basin countries: United States
- Surface area: 500 acres (200 ha)
- Surface elevation: 358 ft (109 m)

Lake Hico was a cooling pond reservoir built on 16th section school land in Jackson, Mississippi, in the 1950s. Its primary purpose was to provide water for the adjacent Rex Brown Plant, which generates electricity with steam. Initially, Lake Hico was open to the public for recreation. The lake was closed to the public in the late 1960s, along with the public swimming pools in Jackson, due to racial prejudices preventing peaceful integration of public swimming holes. Lake Hico was built as a cooling lake for the Rex Brown Electric Generating complex. Part of the agreement with the Hinds County board of supervisors was to have a public recreation lake and a lake for the intake and the exhaust of water for cooling for the generators. Thus the two lakes. It was originally built as a fuel oil based generating system but was later converted to natural gas when oil got so expensive in the 1970s. The reasons why it was finally closed to the public were 1- the Barnett Reservoir opened and most people who had formerly used the lake went there and 2- the liability costs to MP&L skyrocketed after there was a couple of drownings. The fact that integration of such public spaces was being attempted by some and resisted by others in Jackson, Mississippi at the time is possibly pertinent. The adjacent Hico Park was closed after a lawsuit to integrate that park was filed as late as 1975. The Rex Brown plant was just recently totally dismantled.

Water is supplied to Lake Hico by a 5 miles (8.0 km) long pipeline from the Pearl River. The vast majority of water supply to keep the lake full comes from the pipeline. Lake Hico is near the headwaters of Eubanks Creek, but the creek does not flow through the lake. Hico is an abbreviation for Hinds County, the county in which the lake is situated.

The lake is leased to Entergy, the operator of the Rex Brown Plant, by its owner, the State of Mississippi via its trust for 16th section lands. The lease is overseen by Mississippi's Secretary of State, Entergy pays $258,000 per year for the lease on Lake Hico.

Lake Hico covers over 500 acres (200 ha), including a 100+- acre island. The island divides the warmed water coming out of the plant from the cooler main lake. The island has a concrete boat ramp. The lake was home to the Jackson Yacht Club, until the much larger Ross Barnett Reservoir was built in early 1960s.

Lake Hico is encircled completely by a six-foot chain-link fence with "no trespassing" signs. The lake is adjoined on the northeast by a city park, however the fence encircling the lake separates the two.

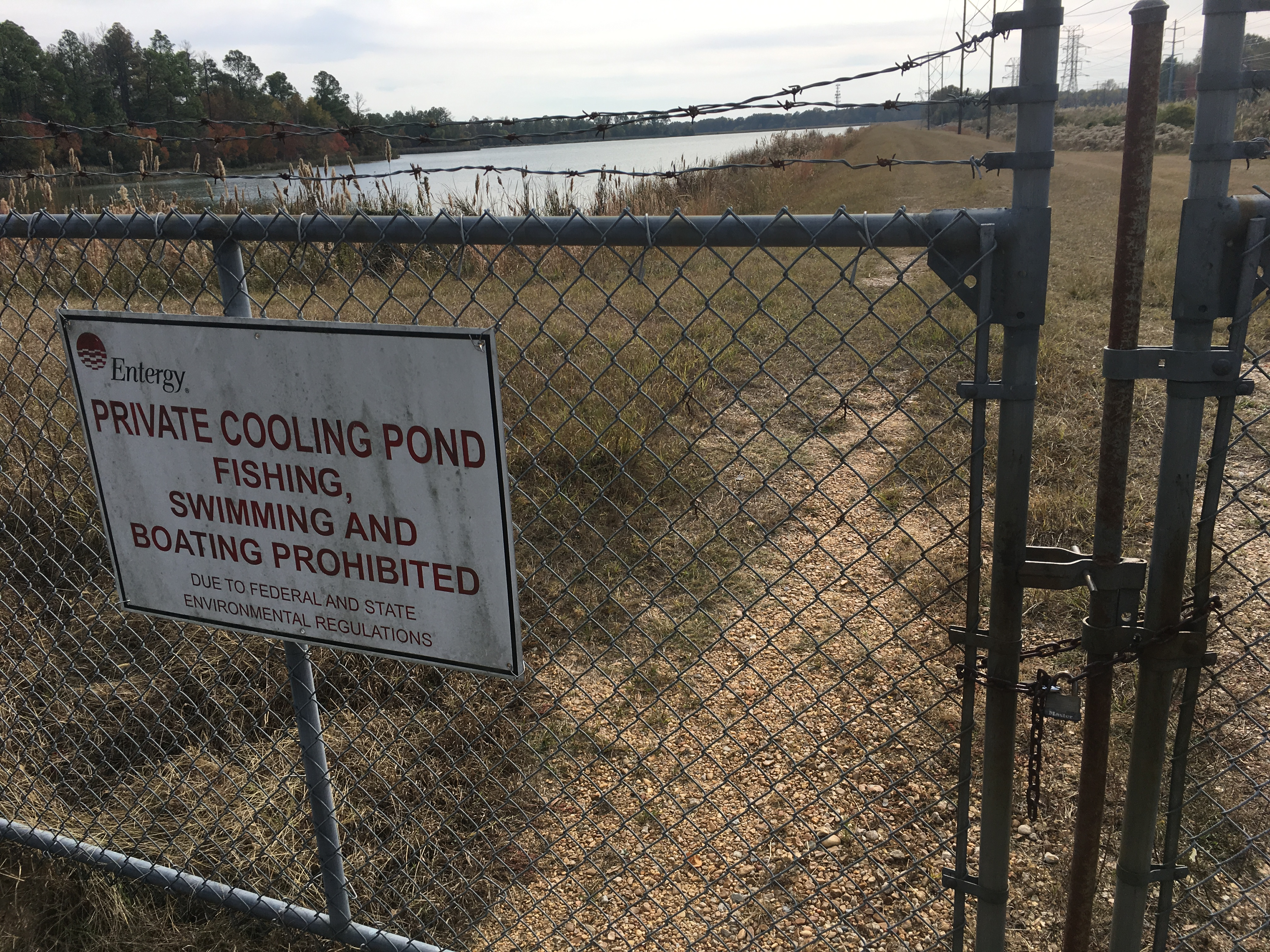
Lake Hico

In 2020 Entergy closed the Rex Brown plant, and soon thereafter relinquished their lease on Lake Hico. Management of the lake property was reverted to its owner - the Jackson Public School District (JPS). According to Mississippi Today, in September 2020, JPS directed Entergy to drain the lake and breach the levee between the "hot" and "cold" sides.

https://mississippitoday.org/2020/11/27/entergy-to-drain-lake-hico-jps-moving-forward-with-development/
