= William Hemingway (politician) =

American politician (1869–1937)

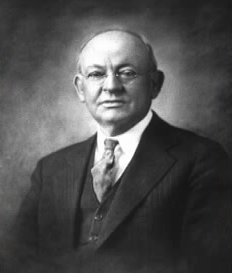
- c. 1915

Mayor of Jackson, Mississippi
- In office 1901–1905
- Preceded by: John W. Todd
- Succeeded by: Oliver Clifton

Member of the Mississippi House of Representatives from the Hinds County district
- In office January 1920 – 1920
- Preceded by: E. H. Green; J. S. Rhodes
- Succeeded by: Robert Stafford Curry

Personal details
- Born: July 19, 1869 Carroll County, Mississippi
- Died: November 5, 1937 (aged 68)
- Party: Democrat

William Hemingway (July 19, 1869 - November 5, 1937) was an American lawyer, politician, and professor. He served as the mayor of Jackson, Mississippi, from 1901 to 1905, and a member of the Mississippi House of Representatives in 1920. He was a Democrat.

== Biography ==
Hemingway was born on July 19, 1869, in Teoc, Carroll County, Mississippi, to Colonel William Linn Hemingway and Mary Elizabeth McCain Hemingway. He graduated from the University of Mississippi in 1889 and was admitted to the bar in 1897. He was the Jackson city attorney from 1909 to 1921. He was also a trustee and secretary of the Mississippi Institution for the Blind from 1912 to 1921. He was elected to the Mississippi House of Representatives to represent Hinds County in 1920, but he resigned soon after election to be the state's Assistant Attorney General. He was later appointed Law Professor at the University of Mississippi, replacing the deceased Leonard J. Farley. He died on November 5, 1937.

== Personal life ==
Hemingway married Grace Hyer in 1901. Her father, William Fisk Hyer, was a member of the Mississippi Legislature in 1871. William and Grace had several children, but all of them died in infancy.
