= Oliver Clifton =

American politician

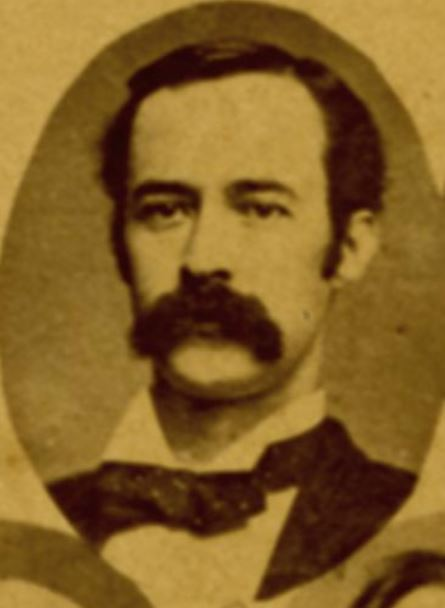
- Clifton in 1876

Mayor of Jackson, Mississippi
- In office 1870–1871
- In office 1895–1897
- In office 1905 – January 2, 1905

Member of the Mississippi House of Representatives from the Hinds County district
- In office 1875-1878

Personal details
- Born: c. 1847 Jackson, Mississippi
- Died: January 2, 1905 (aged 57–58)

Oliver Clifton (c. 1847 - January 2, 1905) was a member of the Mississippi House of Representatives and three-time mayor of Jackson, Mississippi.

== Biography ==
Oliver Clifton was born in about 1847 in Jackson, Mississippi. He first became the mayor of Jackson from 1870 to 1871. He then served in the Mississippi House of Representatives from his election in 1875 to 1878, representing Hinds County. He married Marion Yerger in 1877. He was appointed Clerk of the Mississippi Supreme Court in 1878, a position in which he served until 1894. He then was the mayor from 1895 to 1897. He was elected for a third term in 1904, but died of pneumonia on January 2, 1905, immediately before or after his installation.
