= Charles Henry Manship =

American politician

Charles Henry Manship (July 31, 1812 – June 21, 1895) was a mayor of Jackson, Mississippi, during the American Civil War. He was also a chairmaker and ornamental painter.

== Biography ==
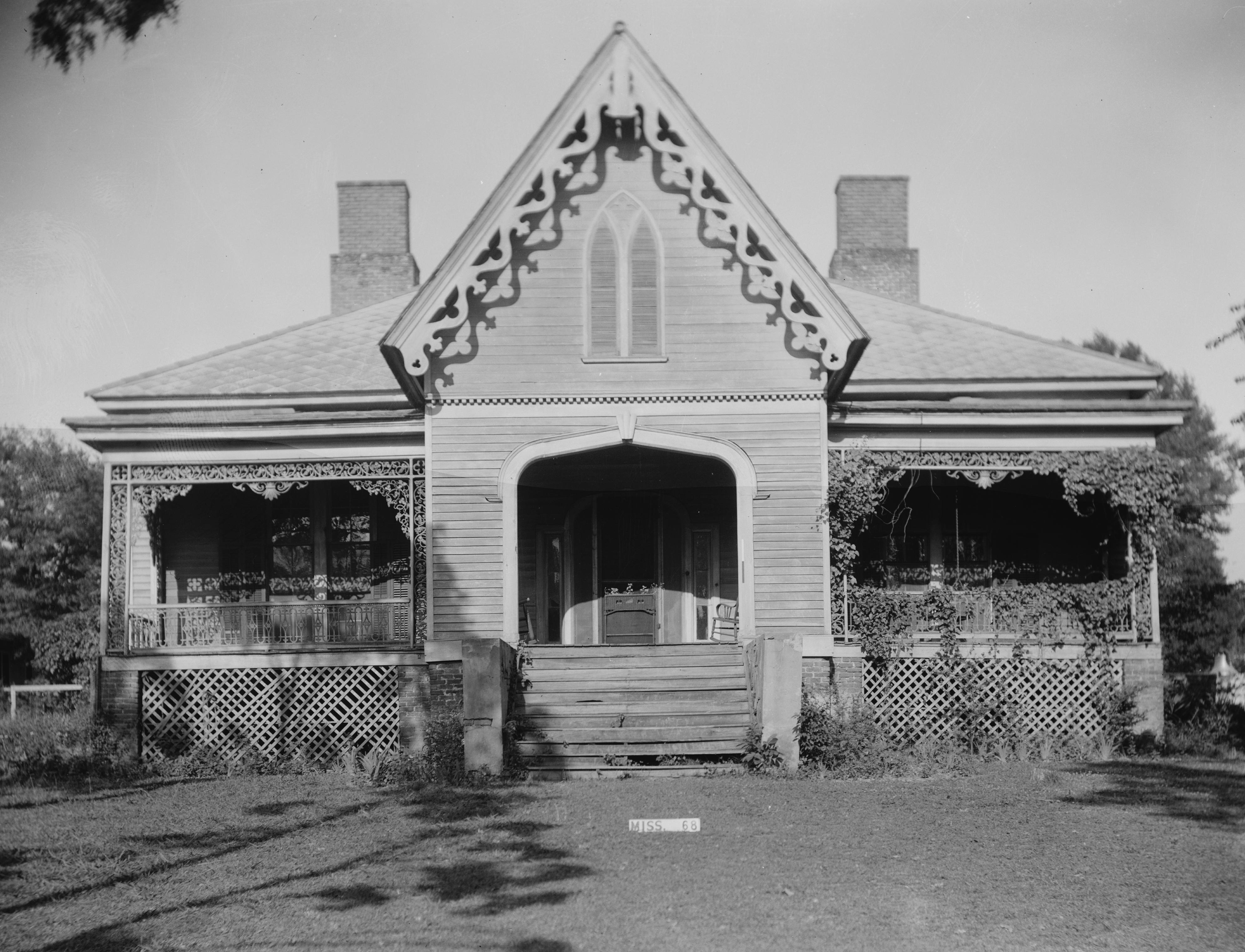
Manship's house

Charles H. Manship, Sr. was born in Chapel District of Talbot County, Maryland. When his father died in 1826, the family moved to Baltimore, where Manship learned the trade of ornamental chair painting and opened his own shop. In 1836, he moved to Jackson, at the time a relatively new town with many public construction projects underway. In 1836, he married Adeline Daley. The couple had fifteen children, five of whom died in infancy.

For his large family, Manship built a Gothic Revival home in 1857. The house was built at 412 East Fortification Street, a location which, at that time, was on the very outskirts of Jackson. Other notable Manship projects included the Jackson City Theatre (1839) and the window reglazing and painting of the Mississippi Governor’s Mansion (1856–1858)

In 1858, 1859 and 1860, he was Alderman of the newly formed City of Jackson. In 1862 and 1863 was the Mayor the same. He had to surrender his city to General Sherman during the Civil War, in May 1863 following the Battle of Jackson.

Charles Manship died in Jackson in 1895 and is buried there. His house has been restored and serves as a museum known as Manship House (Jackson, Mississippi).
