= James H. Boyd (mayor) =

American politician

James Hervey Boyd (14 November 1809 – 4 July 1877) was mayor of Jackson, Mississippi, for four terms. He served at least six terms as alderman, including the years during the American Civil War.

== Early life ==
Born in Mason County, Kentucky, Boyd came down the Ohio and Mississippi Rivers to join his oldest brother, Gordon D. Boyd (1802–1850), in Wilkinson County in the southwest corner of Mississippi, near the Louisiana border.

== Career ==
James assisted his brother, editor and publisher of The Woodville Republican, a newspaper founded in 1823. The two brothers subsequently came to Jackson when it was a small town and fledgling capital in the 1830s.

Brother Gordon Boyd moved up the Natchez Trace to Kosciusko, and James Hervey Boyd settled permanently in Jackson. He was an enthusiastic entrepreneur, first operating a drug store in 1835 and often advertising as an auctioneer.

During his second mayoral term in 1843, Boyd married Eliza Ellis (1823–1902), another Kentucky native. The following year, he joined the Presbyterian Church, where he was an elder for nearly thirty years.

== Residence ==
In 1853, the Boyds built a Greek Revival style cottage, now known as the Oaks House Museum at 823 North Jefferson Street, on a 4-acre (16,000 m^{2}) urban farmstead at the city's edge. There they reared six children. Three generations of the Boyd family lived in the Oaks, the last in 1960, when the property was sold to the National Society of The Colonial Dames of America in the State of Mississippi (NSCDA-MS).

The Boyd House/The Oaks House Museum is operated by the Oaks House Museum Corporation and is open to the public. It is listed on the National Register of Historic Places and is a Mississippi Landmark.
