= Leland S. Speed =

Former mayor of Jackson, Mississippi

Leland Speed

Mayor of Jackson, Mississippi
- In office 1945–1949
- Preceded by: Walter A. Scott
- Succeeded by: Allen C. Thompson

Personal details
- Born: October 20, 1899 Covington County, Mississippi, U.S.
- Died: August 8, 1971 (aged 71) Jackson, Mississippi, U.S.
- Party: Democratic
- Spouse: Katherine Willis Rhymes Speed Ettl (m. 1931)
- Children: 5, including Leland R Speed, James Speed, Shellie Speed Bartlett, Joseph L Speed and Lake C Speed.Lake
- Parent(s): Joseph William Speed & Nebraska Jane “Brack” Pickering Speed

Leland Speed (October 20, 1899 – August 8, 1971) was an investment banker and former mayor of Jackson, Mississippi and the husband of Katherine Rhymes Speed.

== Biography ==
Speed was born on October 20, 1899, in Covington County, Mississippi, to Joseph W. and Nebraska Pickering Speed. He received a business degree from Bowling Green College. He ran for mayor successfully in 1945, defeating incumbent Walter Scott. He ran again in 1949, but was defeated by Allen C. Thompson. He died of "an apparent heart attack" at his home in Jackson on August 8, 1971.

The library at Mississippi College is named after Speed. The funds for the library were given by his children.

== Personal life ==
Speed married Katherine Rhymes in 1931. They had five children: Leland Rhymes (1932–2021), James (1934–1935), Joseph Liston (1940-2024), Shellie (Speed) Bartlett, and Lake Chambers (born 1948).
