= Burgettstown, Pennsylvania =

Borough in Pennsylvania, US

- Borough
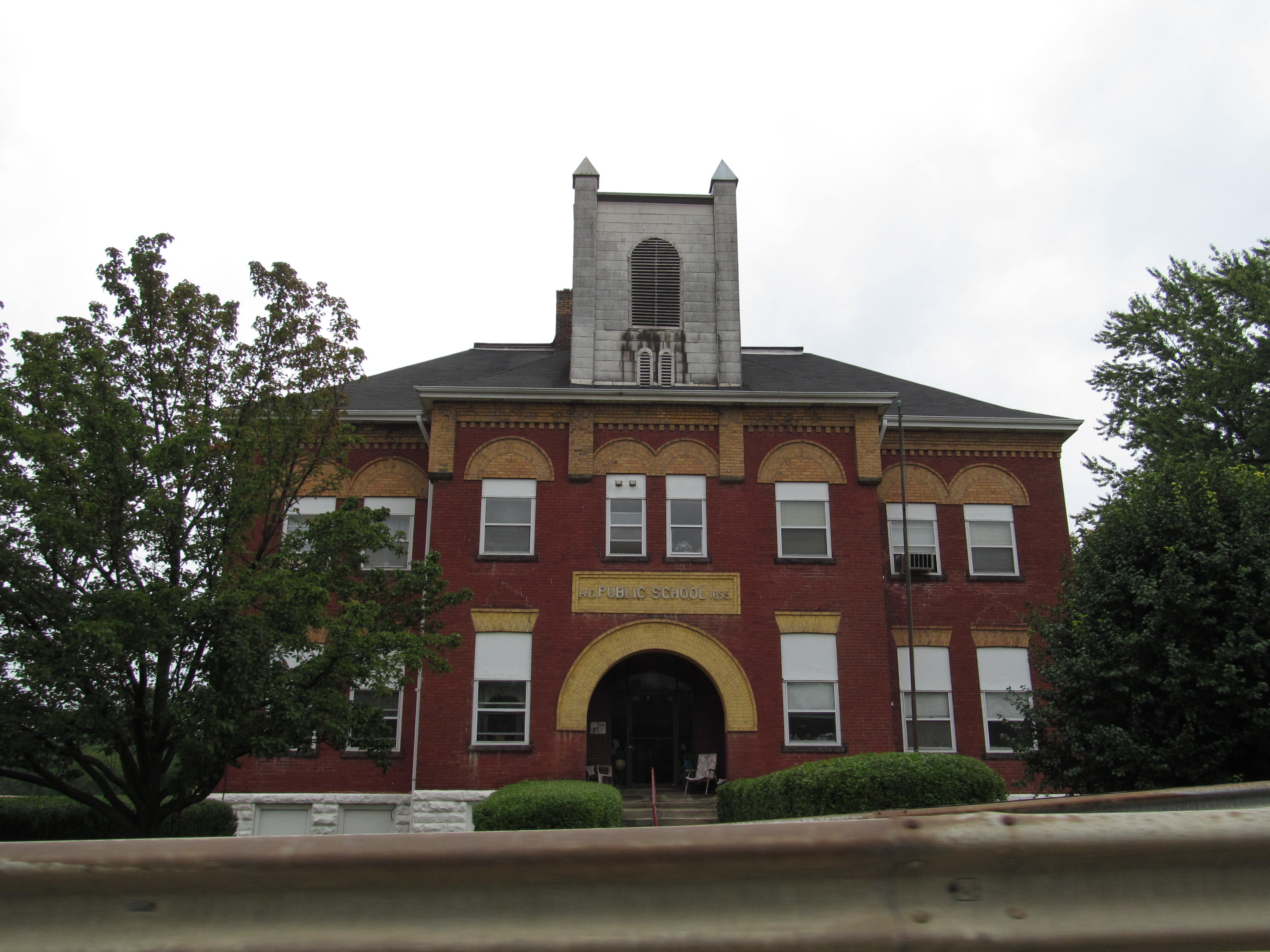
- Former schoolhouse in Burgettstown

- Location of Burgettstown in Washington County, Pennsylvania.

- Location within Pennsylvania Location within the United States
- Coordinates: 40°22′51″N 80°23′28″W
- Country: United States
- State: Pennsylvania
- County: Washington
- Established: 1795

Government
  - Mayor: Luke Snatchko

Area
  - Total: 0.62 sq mi (1.61 km^{2})
  - Land: 0.62 sq mi (1.61 km^{2})
  - Water: 0 sq mi (0.00 km^{2})

Population (2020)
  - Total: 1,425
  - Density: 2,292.3/sq mi (885.07/km^{2})
- Time zone: UTC-4 (EST)
  - Summer (DST): UTC-5 (EDT)
- ZIP Code: 15021
- Area code: 724
- FIPS code: 42-10224
- Website: burgettstownborough.com

Burgettstown is a borough in northwestern Washington County, Pennsylvania, United States. The population was 1,424 according to the 2020 census. It is part of the Pittsburgh metropolitan area.

The Pavilion at Star Lake, a 23,000-seat outdoor amphitheater that hosts many of the Pittsburgh area's headlining concerts, is located near Burgettstown.

== History ==
Burgettstown was laid out in 1795 by Sebastian Burgett, and named for him.

== Geography ==
Burgettstown is located at 40°22′51″N 80°23′28″W (40.380844, -80.391047). According to the U.S. Census Bureau, the borough has a total area of 0.6 square miles (1.6 km^{2}), all land.

=== Surrounding communities ===
Burgettstown is surrounded entirely by Smith Township, which includes the nearby communities of Joffre, Bulger, Cherry Valley, Atlasburg, Slovan, Langeloth, Eldersville, Florence, Paris, and Studa.

== Demographics ==
Historical population
Census	Pop.	Note	%±
1880	876		—
1890	929		6.1%
1900	961		3.4%
1910	1,268		31.9%
1920	1,990		56.9%
1930	2,266		13.9%
1940	2,497		10.2%
1950	2,379		−4.7%
1960	2,383		0.2%
1970	2,118		−11.1%
1980	1,867		−11.9%
1990	1,634		−12.5%
2000	1,576		−3.5%
2010	1,388		−11.9%
2020	1,425		2.7%
2025 (est.)	1,390	▼	−2.5%

At the 2000 census there were 1,576 people, 656 households, and 429 families living in the borough. The population density was 2,531.8 inhabitants per square mile (977.5/km^{2}). There were 703 housing units at an average density of 1,129.3 per square mile (436.0/km^{2}). The racial makeup of the borough was 96.26% White, 1.46% African American, 0.06% Native American, 0.06% Asian, 0.51% from other races, and 1.65% from two or more races. Hispanic or Latino of any race were 2.47%.

Of the 656 households 25.5% had children under the age of 18 living with them, 45.6% were married couples living together, 14.3% had a female householder with no husband present, and 34.6% were non-families. 31.3% of households were one person and 17.8% were one person aged 65 or older. The average household size was 2.34 people and the average family size was 2.93.

The age distribution was 21.6% under the age of 18, 5.2% from 18 to 24, 28.0% from 25 to 44, 23.0% from 45 to 64, and 22.2% 65 or older. The median age was 42 years. For every 100 females, there were 86.5 males. For every 100 females age 18 and over, there were 79.4 males.

The median household income was $33,350 and the median family income was $39,271. Males had a median income of $32,885 versus $23,375 for females. The per capita income for the borough was $16,097. About 7.6% of families and 10.3% of the population were below the poverty line, including 12.8% of those under age 18 and 6.9% of those age 65 or over.

== Government ==
Burgettstown has an elected mayor and five-member city council, who serve four year terms and meet monthly. The current mayor is Luke Snatchko. The current city council members are Annie Hull (council-vice president) Ken McKinney,(Council President) Gary Manges, James Smith, Ronald Allison, Jr.

Burgettstown is split between two congressional districts: Pennsylvania's 14th congressional district, represented by Republican Guy Reschenthaler.

== Education ==
The borough is served by the public Burgettstown Area School District, which includes Burgettstown Middle/High School (grades 6th–12th) and Burgettstown Area Elementary Center (grades K-5th).

Burgettstown Community Library is the home of the Ft. Vance Historical Society and the Washington-Greene County chapter of the Pennsylvania Sports Hall of Fame.

== Notable people ==
- Barry Alvarez, former University of Wisconsin head football coach and Athletics Director
- Robert Linn, fourth-longest-serving mayor of all time, served 58 years of service in Beaver, Pennsylvania
- Joe Tepsic, Major League Baseball outfielder for the Brooklyn Dodgers
- Roger Arliner Young, first African American woman to earn a PhD in zoology
- John D. Fredericks, American lawyer and two term member of the United States House of Representatives.
