= Beaver Historic District =

Historic district in Pennsylvania, United States

- U.S. National Register of Historic Places
- U.S. Historic district
- Pennsylvania state historical marker
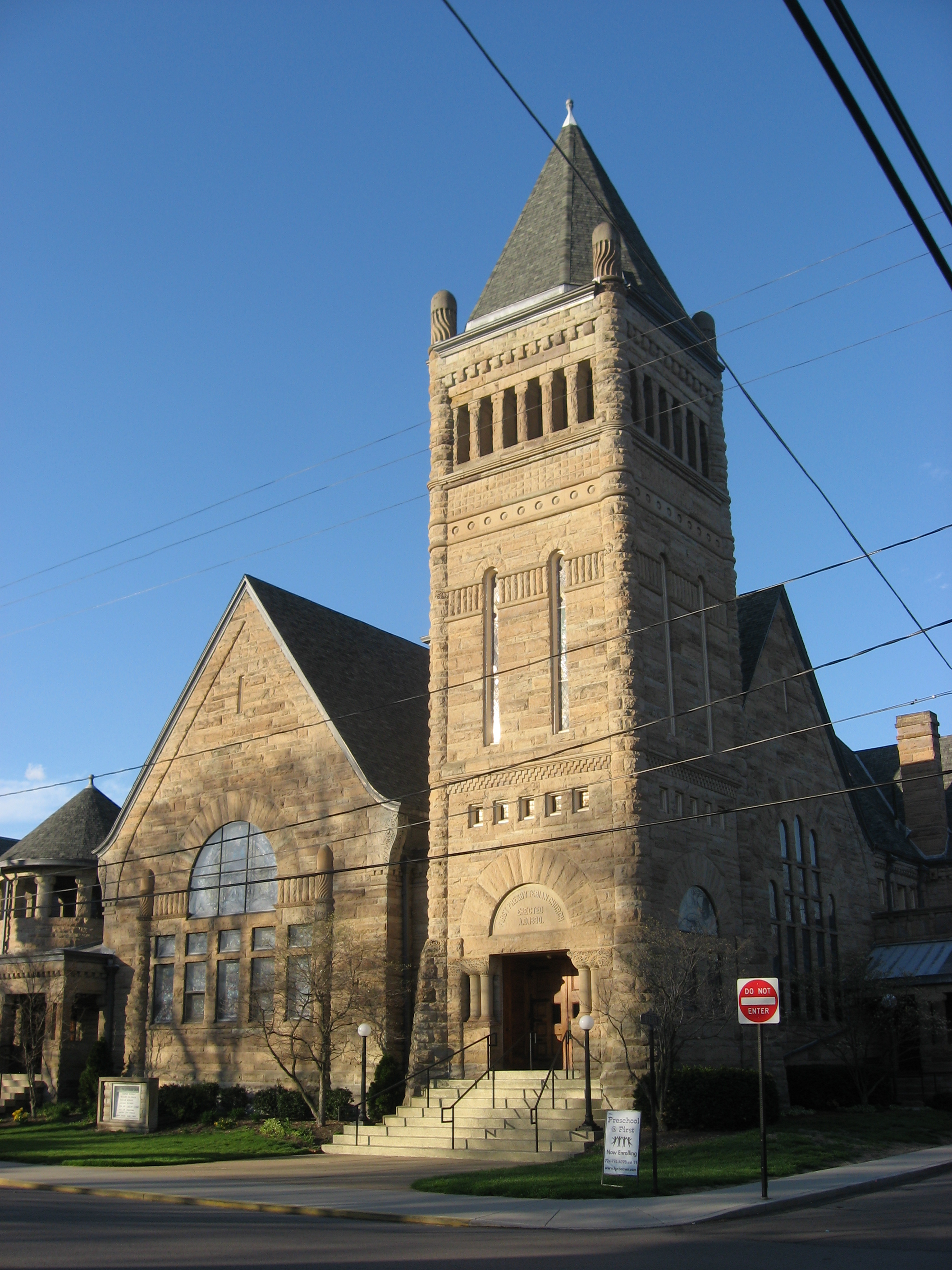
- First Presbyterian Church, a part of the district

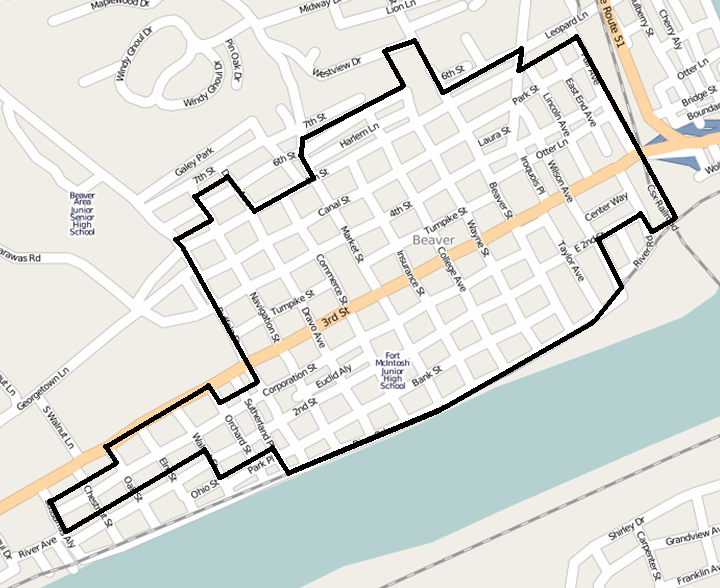
- Map of the Beaver Historic District
- Location: Roughly bounded by the Pittsburgh and Lake Erie Railroad tracks, Fair Ave., 5th St., 3rd St., and Sassafras Ln.
- Area: 317 acres (128 ha)
- Built: 1792
- Architect: multiple
- Architectural style: Italianate, Queen Anne, American Foursquare
- NRHP reference No.: 96001201

Significant dates
- Added to NRHP: October 24, 1996
- Designated PHMC: September 25, 1946

The Beaver Historic District is a historic district in Beaver, Pennsylvania, United States. Listed on the National Register of Historic Places on October 24, 1996, it is centered on Beaver's commercial Third Street and the area around it. The buildings in the district date primarily to the nineteenth century, although some twentieth-century structures are present. Some of the district's most prominent buildings are five churches and the county courthouse, although most of the district consists of residential neighborhoods. Included in the boundaries of the district is the Matthew S. Quay House, the National Historic Landmark home of Beaver native Senator Matthew Quay, and the site of Fort McIntosh, a fort constructed in the 1780s.
