= Robert Linn =

Robert Linn may refer to:

- Robert Linn (politician) (1908–2004), long-serving Pennsylvania borough mayor
- Robert Linn (composer) (1925–1999), American composer
- Robert L. Linn (1938–2015), American educational psychologist
- Bobby Linn (born 1985), Scottish footballer

== See also ==
- Robert Lynn (disambiguation)
- Roberta Linn (born 1928), American singer and entertainer
