= Beaver Area Memorial Library =

Library in Beaver, Pennsylvania

Coordinates: 40.6923°N 80.3019°W

The Beaver Area Memorial Library is part of the Beaver County Library System in Beaver County, Pennsylvania. It is located on College Avenue in Beaver, Pennsylvania.

== History ==
The Beaver Area Memorial Library started as a small collection of books in the basement of the Beaver Trust Co. (Now Huntington Bank) in the 1940s and was run by the Beaver Civic Club. It eventually moved into the basement of a former high school on College Avenue in Beaver. In 1948, the Beaver County courts granted a charter for the official formation of the Beaver Memorial Library. In early 1949, an old house on the corner of Insurance and Fourth Streets was leased from the Beaver Area school district for the price of one dollar per year. With the help of local merchants who donated materials and labors, the old house was completely renovated. The library was officially open to the public on September 17, 1949 with Mrs. W. Wallace Rinehart as its librarian and Miss Jean Sebring as her assistant. By April 1950, the library already had a reported collection of over 4,000 books.

By 1959, the expanding library had outgrown its quarters on Insurance and Fourth, so the Board of Trustees purchased property on River Road and College Avenue to be used for a new building. A fundraiser was started in Beaver County in 1961 to raise the $130 thousand to build the new establishment. Due to the support of citizens county wide, the name of the library was changed in 1961 to the Beaver Area Memorial Library to reflect this support. The new building, which continues to serve as the public library today, was officially dedicated on April 8, 1962 and open to the public.

Over the next fourteen years, the library continued to expand. By 1974 library services and clientele had increased by almost five-fold. Because of this growth, the Board of Trustees put into work an expansion of this building which was finished in 1980. This addition added 2,500 square feet (230 m^{2}) at a cost of nearly $140 thousand.

The library soon outgrew this new addition, and the necessity for yet another addition arose. This time, 4,200 square feet (390 m^{2}) was added to the library; expanding storage space, increasing the children's library, enhancing the work area, and allowing more computers to be added to suit growing public demand for them. During this addition, landscaping and the exterior appearance of the library underwent significant improvements. In total, the new renovations costs a total of $1 million.

The last and latest addition added to the library was completed in 2003 with the addition of a new wing in the library. Originally planned for the spring of 1998, unforeseen delays stalled the project until early 2001. This new facility was dedicated on May 13, 2003.

== Time line ==
1948-

- A small collection of books in the basement of the Beaver Trust Co. run by the Beaver Civic Club.
- A charter was granted to the Beaver Civic Club to found the Library.

1949-

- A house was leased to the newly established library on the corner of Insurance and Fourth Streets.
- The house underwent renovations to make it suitable to serve as a small library.

1950-

- Reported collection of 4,000 books.

1959-

- Land purchased on the corner of River Road and College Avenue to be used as a site for a new library.

1961-

- Fundraiser was launched to raise money for the new library building.

1961-

- The name of the library is officially changed to the Beaver Area Memorial Library.

1962-

- The new library building was dedicated.

1974-

- Services and clientele have increased five-fold from 1960.

1980-

- 2,500 square foot expansion is completed, costing just under $140 thousand.

1998-

- Board of Trustees plan to renovate the library.

2001-

- Renovations are started.

2003-

- Renovations are completed, adding a new wing to the library.

== Collection Information ==
=== The Beaver Area memorial Library has, as of 2008 ===
- Over 56,000 books
- One hundred various magazine and newspaper subscriptions
- Over 9,000 registered borrowers
- Loaned over 179,000 materials to individuals
- Have had over 142,000 visitors

=== This library also provides, for public use ===
- A collection of The Beaver County Times on microfilm, dating back to July 1991
- A selection of several computers for public use
- A CD-Rom database
- A collection of audio cassettes, DVDs, video cassettes, audio CDs, and reading materials for the visually impaired
- Photocopiers, typewriters, and FAX machines
- A meeting room for non-profit organizations
- A large selection of programs throughout the year for both adults and children
