= Roberts-Quay House =

Historic house in Pennsylvania, United States

- U.S. National Register of Historic Places
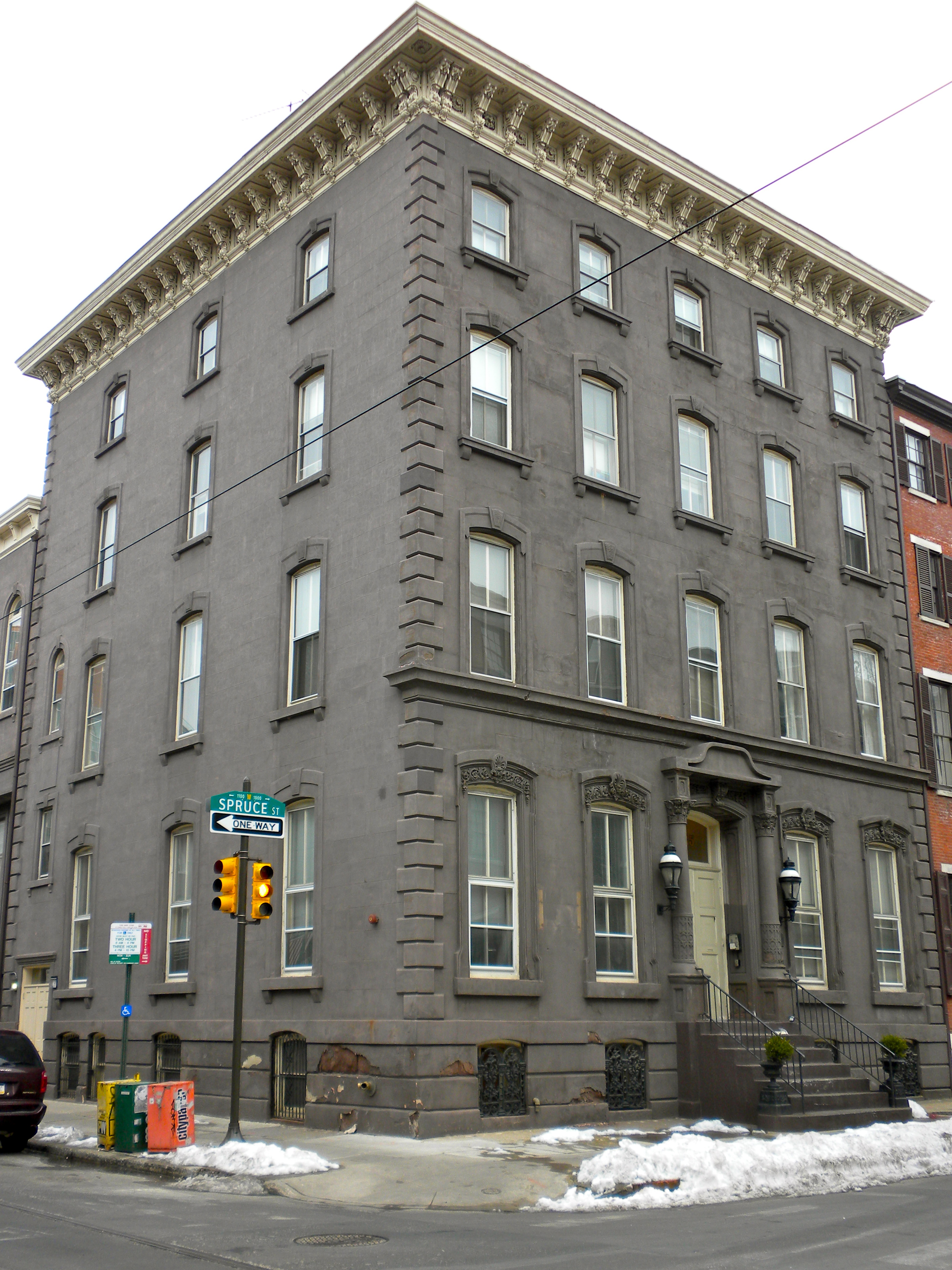
- Roberts-Quay House, February 2010

- Location within Philadelphia Location within Pennsylvania Location within the United States
- Location: 1035–1037 Spruce Street, Philadelphia, Pennsylvania
- Coordinates: 39°56′47″N 75°9′35″W
- Area: less than an acre
- Built: c. 1850
- Architectural style: Renaissance, Romano-Tuscan
- NRHP reference No.: 76001668
- Added to NRHP: November 13, 1976

The Roberts-Quay House is an historic home that is located in the Washington Square West neighborhood of Philadelphia, Pennsylvania, United States. The original section was built circa 1850; it was then expanded in 1889, 1906, 1921, and 1928.

It was added to the National Register of Historic Places in 1976.

== Overview ==
This historic residence was the home of Matthew Quay (1833–1904), a United States Senator from Pennsylvania. Its original section measures forty-seven feet by fifty-one feet, and is a four-story building with a brownstone face and sides of stucco, scored as brownstone. It has a basement, attic, and cupola and was designed in a Renaissance Revival style. The expansions to the north added one hundred feet to the depth of the building.

== See also ==
- Matthew S. Quay House
