= John Bancker Aycrigg =

American politician

Member of the U.S. House of Representatives from New Jersey's at-large district
- In office March 4, 1841 – March 3, 1843
- Preceded by: Philemon Dickerson
- Succeeded by: District inactive
- In office March 4, 1837 – March 3, 1839
- Preceded by: William Chetwood
- Succeeded by: Philemon Dickerson

Personal details
- Born: John Bancker Aycrigg; July 9, 1798 New York City, New York, U.S.
- Died: November 8, 1856 (aged 58) Passaic, New Jersey, U.S.
- Resting place: Cedar Lawn Cemetery in Paterson, New Jersey
- Party: Whig

John Bancker Aycrigg (July 9, 1798 – November 8, 1856) was an American medical doctor and politician who represented New Jersey in the United States House of Representatives in two non-consecutive terms from 1837 to 1839 and 1841 to 1843.

== Early life and education ==
Aycrigg was born in New York City. He studied medicine and was graduated from the College of Physicians and Surgeons which is now the medical department of Columbia University in 1818. He was admitted to practice in New York. Later, he moved to Paramus, New Jersey.

== Congress ==
Aycrigg was elected as a Whig to the Twenty-fifth Congress (March 4, 1837 – March 4, 1839). He presented credentials as a Member-elect to the Twenty-sixth Congress, but was not permitted to qualify. He was elected as a Whig to the Twenty-seventh Congress (March 4, 1841 – March 4, 1843), but was not a candidate for renomination in 1842 to the Twenty-eighth Congress.

== After Congress ==
After leaving Congress, he resumed the practice of medicine in Paramus, New Jersey and later moved to Passaic, New Jersey.

== Death and legacy ==
He died in Passaic in 1856 and was buried in Paramus Church Cemetery, Ridgewood, New Jersey. His remains were later removed from the Paramus Church Cemetery and were interred in the Aycrigg family plot at Cedar Lawn Cemetery in Paterson, New Jersey.

His home, the Aycrigg Mansion is listed on the National Register of Historic Places. Aycrigg Avenue in Passaic is named after him.

U.S. House of Representatives
Preceded by William Chetwood	Member of the U.S. House of Representatives from New Jersey's at-large congressional district 1837–1839	Succeeded by Philemon Dickerson
Preceded by Philemon Dickerson	Member of the U.S. House of Representatives from New Jersey's at-large congressional district 1841–1843	Succeeded by District inactive
