= William Chetwood =

American attorney and politician (1771–1857)

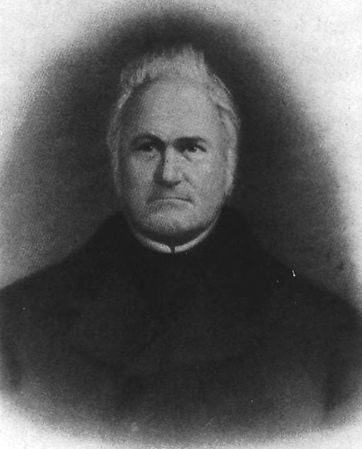

Member of the U.S. House of Representatives from New Jersey's at-large district
- In office December 5, 1836 – March 3, 1837
- Preceded by: Philemon Dickerson
- Succeeded by: John Bancker Aycrigg

Mayor of Elizabeth, New Jersey
- In office 1839–1841
- Preceded by: Philemon Dickerson

Personal details
- Born: June 17, 1771 Elizabeth, Province of New Jersey, British America
- Died: December 17, 1857 (aged 86) Elizabeth, New Jersey, U.S.
- Resting place: Evergreen Cemetery
- Education: Princeton College

William Chetwood (June 17, 1771 – December 17, 1857) was a U.S. representative from New Jersey. He was the mayor of Elizabethtown, New Jersey, from 1839 to 1841.

== Early life ==
Chetwood was born on June 17, 1771, in Elizabeth, New Jersey. He was the son of John Chetwood, an attorney, and Mary (née Emott) Chetwood (d. 1786). His elder sister, Elizabeth Chetwood, was the wife of Aaron Ogden, a U.S. senator who also served as the 5th governor of New Jersey.

He graduated from Princeton College in 1792, where he studied law. He was admitted to the bar in 1796 and commenced practice in Elizabeth, New Jersey.

== Career ==
He served as prosecutor of the pleas for Essex County, became a member of the State Council of New Jersey, was a major of militia and served in the Whiskey Rebellion of 1794 as aide-de-camp to Major General Henry "Light Horse Harry" Lee.

Chetwood was elected as a Whig (at the time, a coalition of National Republican Party members) to the Twenty-fourth Congress to fill the vacancy caused by the resignation of Philemon Dickerson. He served in Congress from December 5, 1836, to March 3, 1837, afterwards resuming the practice of law. In 1841 and 1842 he was elected to the New Jersey Legislative Council from Essex County, New Jersey.

== Personal life ==
Chetwood was married to Mary Barber (1780–1873), a daughter of Anna (née Edwards) Barber and Col. Francis Barber, who served in the Revolutionary War. Together, they were the parents of:

- Matilda Maria Chetwood (1811–1899), who married William Gedney Bull, a wealthy merchant engaged in the "China trade".

He died on December 17, 1857, in Elizabeth, New Jersey, at the age of 86. He was interred in Hillside's Evergreen Cemetery.

=== Descendants ===
Through his daughter Matilda, who lived at 3 East 9th Street in Manhattan, he was a grandfather of Hetty Bull (1846-1906), who married John Cuming Beatty and had three children, including Sir Alfred Chester Beatty, the American-British mining magnate.

U.S. House of Representatives
Preceded by Philemon Dickerson	Member of the U.S. House of Representatives from New Jersey's at-large congressional district December 5, 1836 – March 3, 1837	Succeeded by John B. Aycrigg
