= James Eagan =

American politician

James J. "Jim" Eagan

Mayor of Florissant, Missouri
- In office 1963–2000
- Succeeded by: Robert Lowery Sr.

Personal details
- Born: March 4, 1926
- Died: November 2, 2000

Not to be confused with James Eagan Holmes

James J. "Jim" Eagan (March 4, 1926 - November 2, 2000) was an American politician and lawyer who was known for serving as the mayor of Florissant, Missouri, for 37 years from 1963 until his death in the year 2000. Between 1950 and 1970, the city of Florissant greatly expanded in population from less than 4,000 in 1950 to nearly 66,000, making it the most populous city in St. Louis County, Missouri, the populous county in the state of Missouri; many residents worked for the McDonnell Aircraft Corporation and other area manufacturers. Robert Lowery Sr. (1938-2018), who had served as police chief for 22 years, succeeded him as mayor in 2001.

Eagan served in the U.S. military during World War II and saw action at Iwo Jima and Okinawa. He was an Irish-Catholic Democrat who was willing to support some Republican Party candidates. He helped initiate one the first municipal-operated emergency life-support services, a municipal-owned professional theater, and free transportation for the elderly.

The James J Eagan Community Center located at 1 James J Eagan Dr in Florissant is named after him.

== See also ==
- List of longest-serving mayors in the United States
