= Studa, Pennsylvania =

Unincorporated community in Pennsylvania, US

Coordinates: 40°18′13″N 80°26′48″W

- Unincorporated community
- Interactive map of Studa, Pennsylvania
- Country: United States
- State: Pennsylvania
- County: Washington
- Time zone: UTC-5 (Eastern (EST))
  - Summer (DST): UTC-4 (EDT)

Studa is an unincorporated community in Cross Creek Township, Washington County, Pennsylvania, United States. It is located 2 miles north of Avella, and 6 miles south-southwest of Burgettstown.
