= Robert Lynn =

Robert Lynn may refer to:

- Sir Robert Lynn (Northern Ireland politician) (Robert John Lynn, 1873–1945), Ulster Unionist Party politician
- Robert J. Lynn (New Hampshire judge) (born 1964), justice of the New Hampshire Supreme Court
- Robert Lynn (director) (1918–1982), British film and TV director
- Robert L. Lynn (1931–2020), American poet
- Robert Lynn (Australian politician) (1873–1928), Australian businessman and politician
- Robert Lynn (water polo) (born 1967), American water polo player
- Robert Lynn (businessman) (1920–1998), American businessman and co-founder of DHL

== See also ==
- Robert Lyne (1885–1957), Welsh field hockey player
- Robert Linn (disambiguation)
