= Aycrigg Mansion =

Historic house in New Jersey, United States

- U.S. National Register of Historic Places
- New Jersey Register of Historic Places
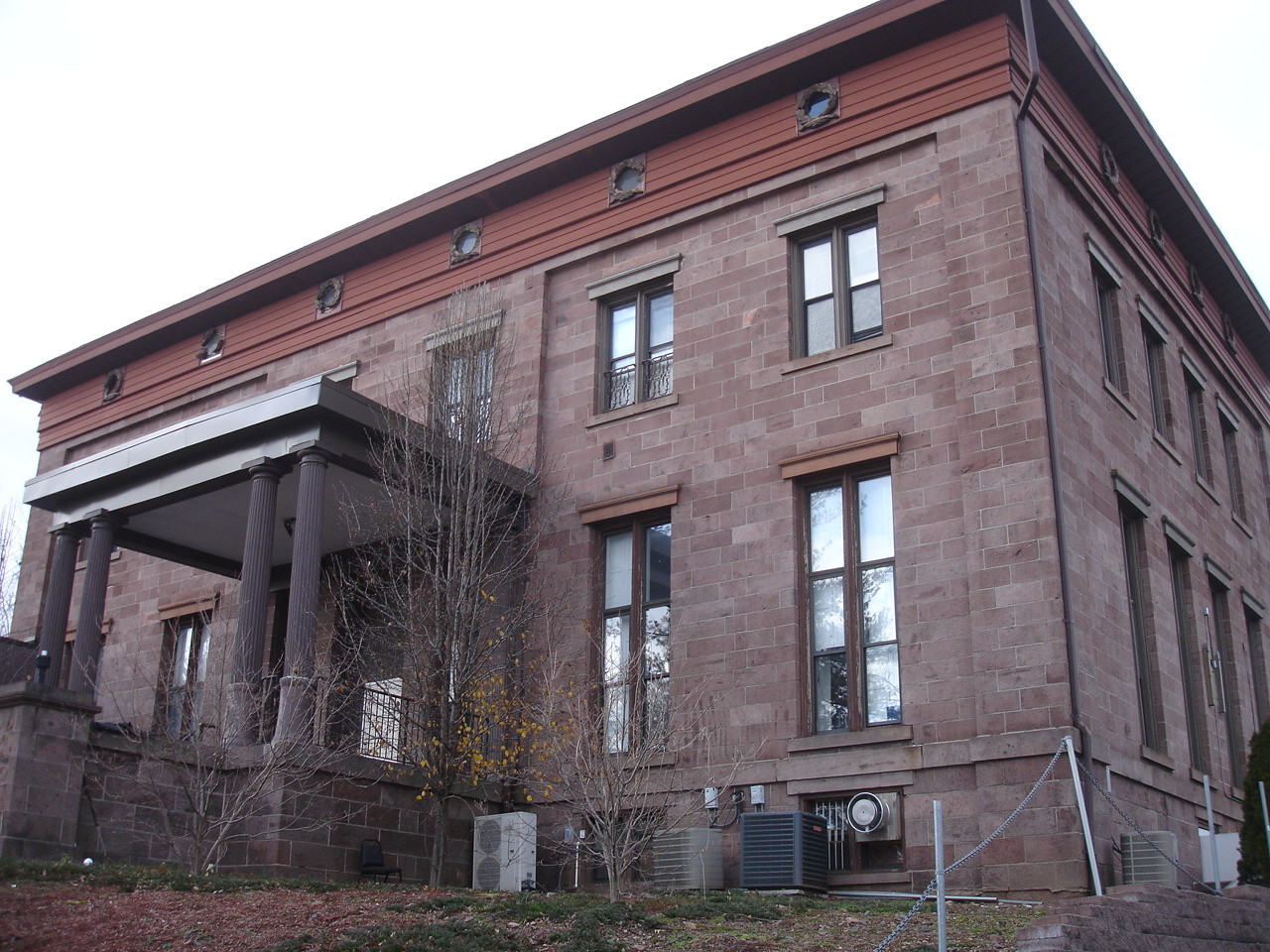

- Location within Passaic County, New Jersey Location within New Jersey Location within the United States
- Location: Main Avenue and Temple Place, Passaic, New Jersey
- Coordinates: 40°51′2″N 74°7′30″W
- Area: 0.8 acres (0.32 ha)
- Built: 1848
- Architectural style: Renaissance, Italian Palazzo
- NRHP reference No.: 82003299
- NJRHP No.: 2349

Significant dates
- Added to NRHP: April 29, 1982
- Designated NJRHP: June 16, 1981

Aycrigg Mansion, located in Passaic, Passaic County, New Jersey, United States, was the home of John Bancker Aycrigg. The mansion was built in 1848 and was added to the National Register of Historic Places on April 29, 1982, for its significance in architecture, education, politics/government, and social history.

== History ==
In 1848, Dr. John Bancker Aycrigg, a physician and politician who represented New Jersey in the United States House of Representatives, built the Renaissance revival Italian Palazzo style home for his family. One of Aycrigg's sons, Benjamin Bogert Aycrigg, was the first mayor of Passaic, in 1873 and later owned the mansion.

In 1899, the house became the first permanent home of the Passaic Collegiate School (which today is at 22 Kent Court). In 1908, the house became the new home of several Masonic lodges, which it remained until 1994. For a several years, the house was the home to the Passaic Museum which shut down due to financial issues.

Since the late 1990s, the structure houses a boy's religious high school, Mesivta Tiferes R' Tzvi Aryeh Zemel.

== Gallery ==
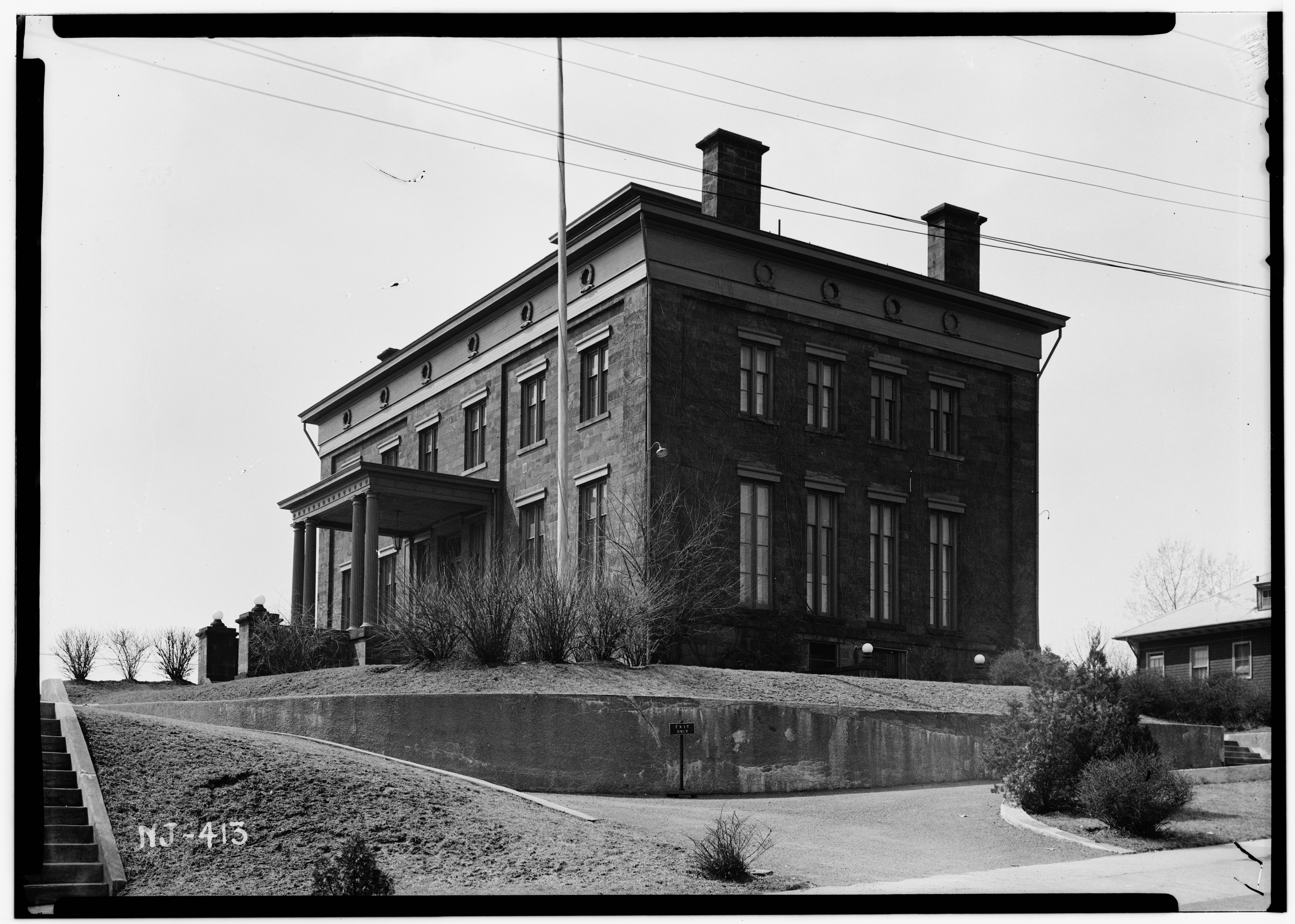
Exterior view from east

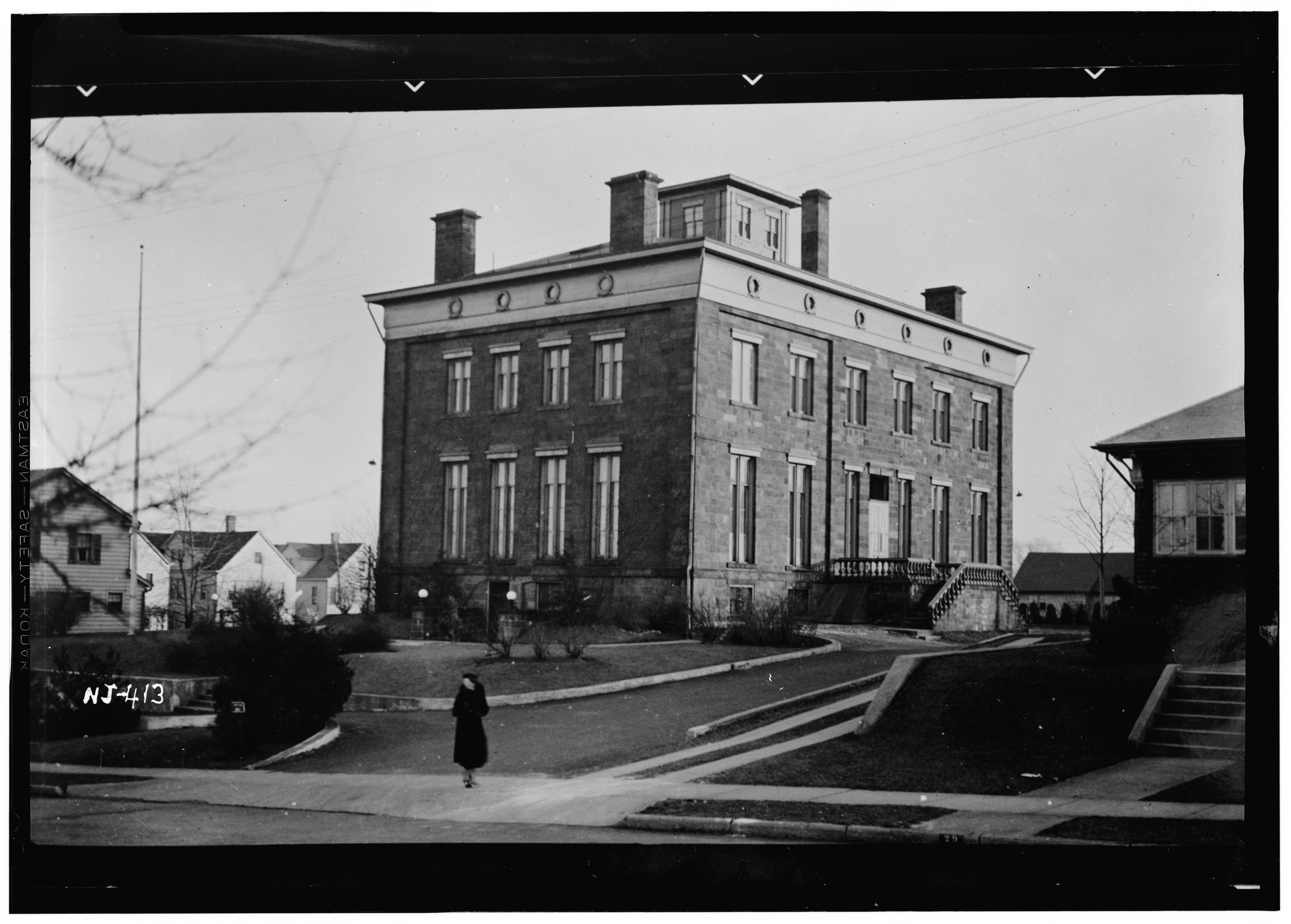
Exterior looking south

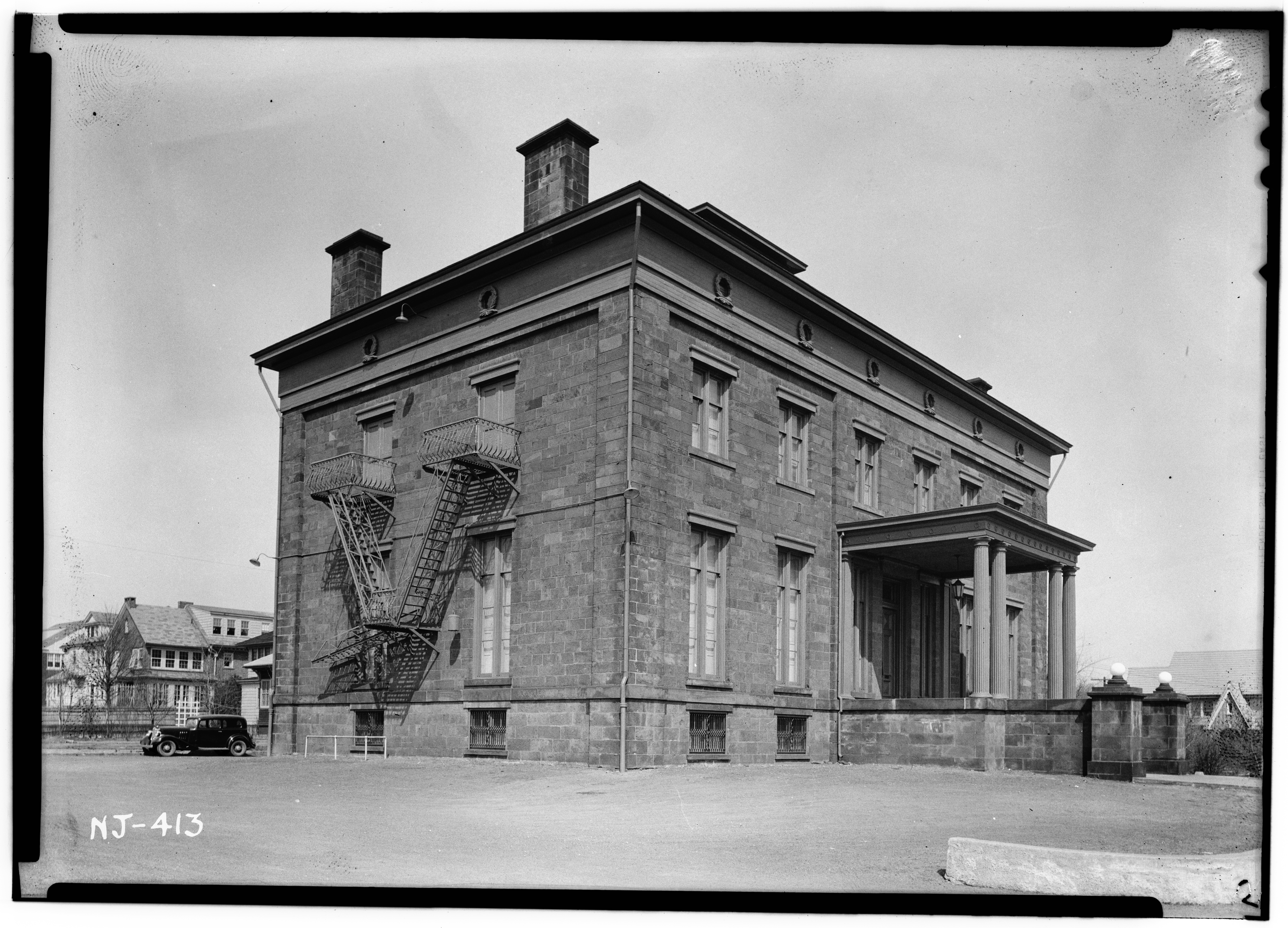
Exterior looking north

== See also ==
- National Register of Historic Places listings in Passaic County, New Jersey
