= Philemon Dickerson =

American judge (1788–1862)

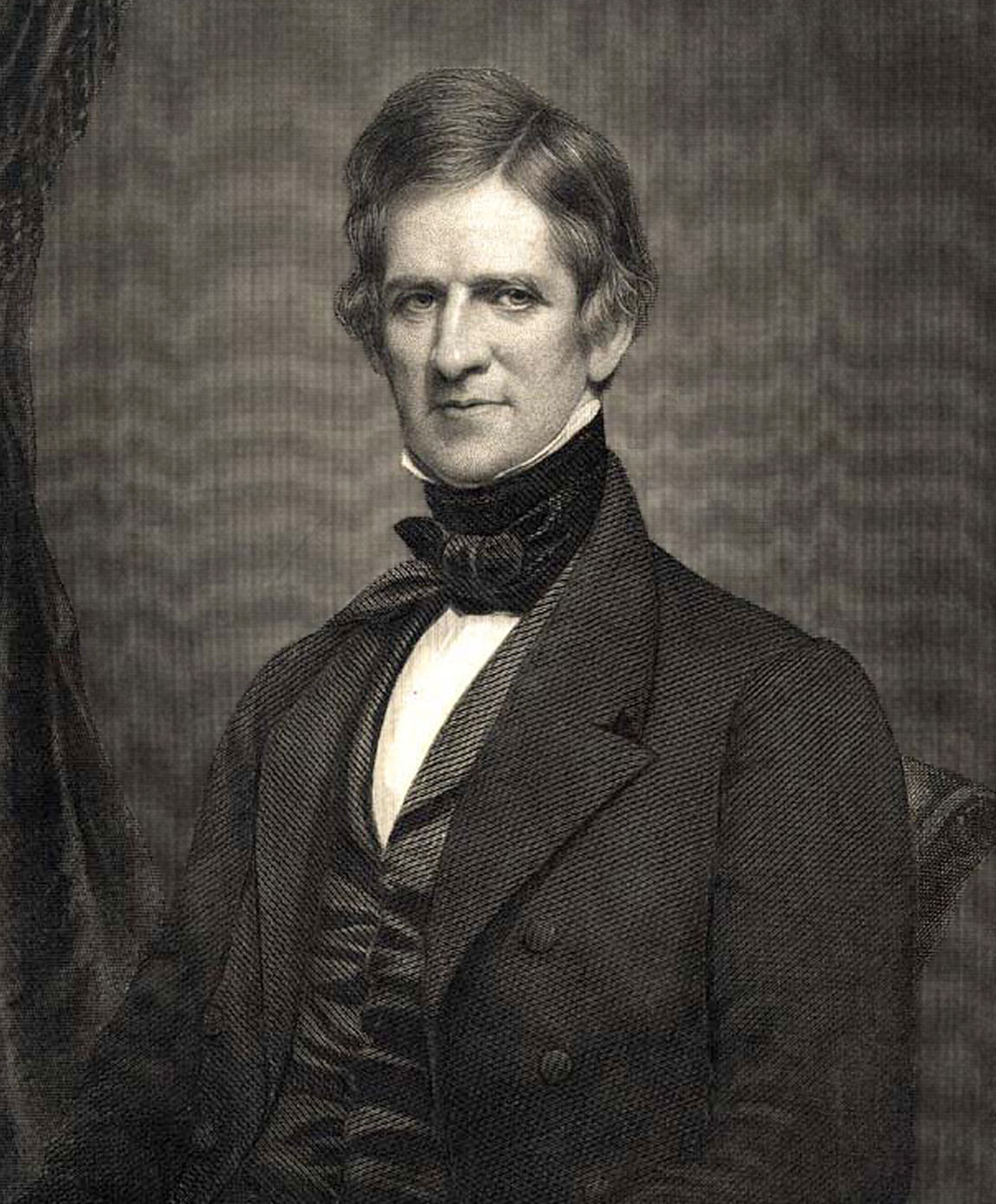

Judge of the United States District Court for the District of New Jersey
- In office March 2, 1841 – December 10, 1862
- Appointed by: Martin Van Buren
- Preceded by: Mahlon Dickerson
- Succeeded by: Richard Stockton Field

12th Governor of New Jersey
- In office November 3, 1836 – October 27, 1837
- Preceded by: Peter Dumont Vroom
- Succeeded by: William Pennington

Member of the U.S. House of Representatives from New Jersey's at-large district
- In office March 4, 1833 – November 3, 1836
- Preceded by: Silas Condit
- Succeeded by: William Chetwood
- In office March 4, 1839 – March 3, 1841
- Preceded by: John Bancker Aycrigg
- Succeeded by: John Bancker Aycrigg

Personal details
- Born: Philemon Dickerson; January 11, 1788 Succasunna, New Jersey, U.S.
- Died: December 10, 1862 (aged 74) Paterson, New Jersey, U.S.
- Resting place: Cedar Lawn Cemetery, Paterson
- Party: Democratic
- Relatives: Mahlon Dickerson (brother)
- Education: University of Pennsylvania (A.B.)
- Profession: Attorney

Philemon Dickerson (January 11, 1788 – December 10, 1862) was a United States representative from New Jersey, the 12th governor of New Jersey and judge of the United States District Court for the District of New Jersey.

== Education and career ==
Born on January 11, 1788, (Note: Dickerson's gravestone and some other sources give his birth June 26, 1788. However, both FJC Bio and CongBio, as well as other sources give his date as January 11, 1788, which date will be used in this article.) in Succasunna, New Jersey, Dickerson pursued classical studies, received an Artium Baccalaureus degree in 1808 from the University of Pennsylvania and read law in 1813. He was admitted to the bar and entered private practice in Philadelphia, Pennsylvania, from 1813 to 1816. He continued private practice in Paterson, New Jersey from 1816 to 1821, and from 1822 to 1833, having been admitted as a counselor in 1817. He was a member of the New Jersey General Assembly from Essex County, from 1821 to 1822.

== Congressional and gubernatorial service ==
Dickerson was elected as a Jacksonian Democrat from New Jersey's at-large congressional district to the United States House of Representatives of the 23rd and 24th United States Congresses and served from March 4, 1833, until November 3, 1836, when he resigned, having been chosen as the 12th Governor of New Jersey by the New Jersey Legislature. He served as Governor and ex officio Chancellor from November 3, 1836, to October 27, 1837. He was appointed sergeant at law in 1834, being the last person in New Jersey to hold that title. He resumed private practice in Paterson from 1837 to 1839. He was elected as a Democrat to the 26th United States Congress, serving from March 4, 1839, to March 3, 1841. He was an unsuccessful candidate for reelection to the 27th United States Congress.

== Federal judicial service ==
Dickerson was nominated by President Martin Van Buren on February 22, 1841, to a seat on the United States District Court for the District of New Jersey vacated by his brother, Judge Mahlon Dickerson. He was confirmed by the United States Senate on February 27, 1841, and received his commission on March 2, 1841.

Concurrent with his federal judicial service, Dickerson was City Council President for Paterson, New Jersey, in 1851. His service terminated on December 10, 1862, due to his death in Paterson. He was interred in Cedar Lawn Cemetery in Paterson.

== Family ==
Dickerson was the brother of Mahlon Dickerson, a United States senator from New Jersey and Dickerson's predecessor on the United States District Court for the District of New Jersey.

== Sources ==
- United States Congress. "Philemon Dickerson (id: D000309)". Biographical Directory of the United States Congress.
- Philemon Dickerson at the Biographical Directory of Federal Judges, a publication of the Federal Judicial Center.
- New Jersey Governor Philemon Dickerson, National Governors Association
- Biography of Philemon Dickerson from The Political Graveyard

U.S. House of Representatives
| Preceded by Silas Condit | United States Representative from New Jersey's at-large congressional district 1833–1836 | Succeeded by William Chetwood |
| Preceded by John Bancker Aycrigg | United States Representative from New Jersey's at-large congressional district 1839–1841 | Succeeded by John Bancker Aycrigg |
Political offices
| Preceded by Peter Dumont Vroom | Governor of New Jersey; 1836–1837 | Succeeded by William Pennington |
Legal offices
| Preceded by Mahlon Dickerson | Judge of the United States District Court for the District of New Jersey; 1841–1862 | Succeeded by Richard Stockton Field |
