= Louise Tanner Brown =

American businesswoman (1883–1955)

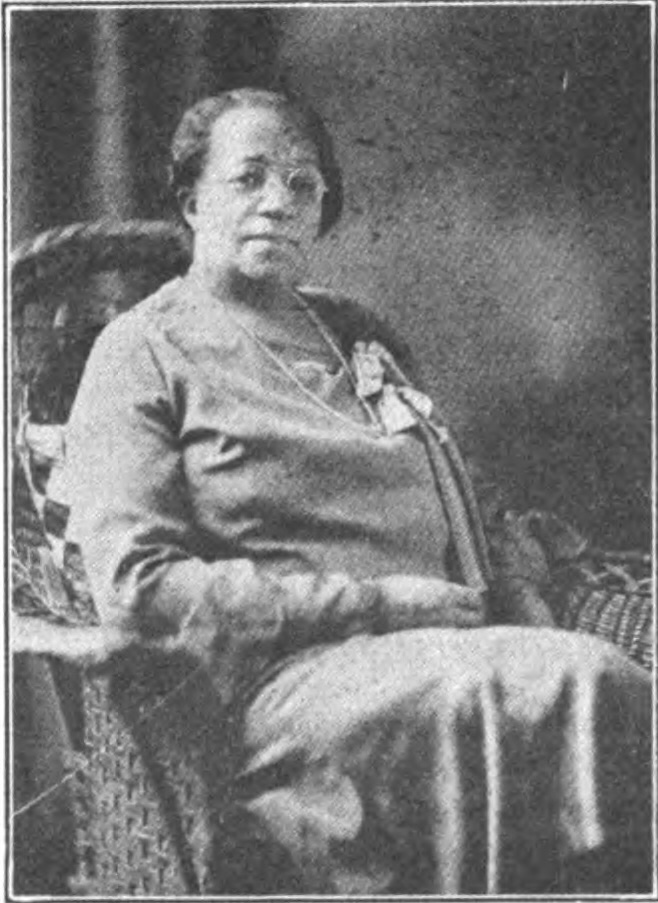
- Born: 1883; Beaver, Pennsylvania, U.S.
- Died: November 18, 1955 (aged 71–72); Dayton, Ohio, U.S.
- Occupation: Businessperson

Louise Tanner Brown (1883 – November 18, 1955) was an American businesswoman from Scranton, Pennsylvania. She took over her husband's transportation company in 1923 after his death and quickly doubled the size of the firm, building a fleet of 14 modern trucks and employing more than 20 workers by 1930.

== Biography ==
Louise Tanner was born in Beaver, Pennsylvania, in 1883. Her father was an A.M.E. minister. She went to school in Pittsburgh and ran a beauty salon for six years before marrying George W. Brown and moving to Scranton. Her husband owned and operated a small draying company that transported goods for short distances on behalf of A&P, grocery and department stores, and households. After Mr. Brown died in 1923, his wife took over the firm. She doubled its annual revenue from $35,000 to $72,000, building a fleet of 14 modern trucks and employing more than 20 workers by 1930. Brown averted racial discord by hiring equal numbers of Black and white truck drivers and paying her workers well under a collective bargaining agreement. The business survived the Great Depression, and she sold the firm to Granville Smith Sr. in the 1940s.

Brown was a gifted orator and an active community leader. She organized a political league for Black women in 1920 and at various times served on the boards of directors of the Scranton branch of the NAACP, the Fidelis Club of the YMCA, the local Bethel A.M.E. Church, the Scranton Progressive Recreation and Social Center, and the Scranton Red Cross. In 1930, she was nominated for the William E. Harmon Foundation Award for Distinguished Achievement Among Negroes. She remarried in 1946, to retired minister P. A. Scott.

Brown died on November 18, 1955, in Dayton, Ohio, where she had gone to live with her niece. She was interred in Scranton.

Installed at the urging of First Lady Frances Wolf, a 2019 exhibit at the Pennsylvania Governor's Residence celebrated 32 Pennsylvania women who were "Game Changers", including Brown alongside more famous residents such as Grace Kelly.
