= Ida Geer Weller =

American singer and clubwoman

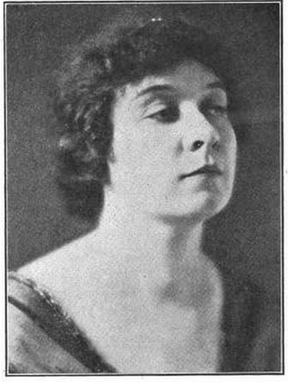
- Ida Geer Weller, from a 1920 publication

Background information
- Born: 1881
- Origin: United States
- Died: 1944 (aged 62–63)
- Occupations: Concert singer and Clubwoman

Ida Geer Weller (1881-1944) was an American concert singer and clubwoman.

== Early life ==
Ida Geer was from Beaver, Pennsylvania.

== Career ==
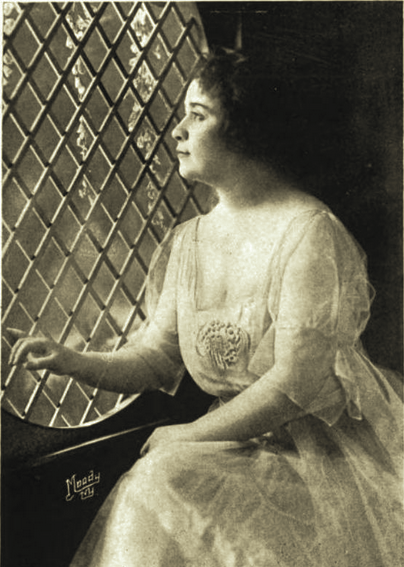
Ida Geer Weller (1913)

Ida Geer Weller was a mezzo-contralto. Her voice was described as being "of great range and flexibility, large in natural volume, but leading itself easily to lighter work." She started performing in Pittsburgh as a concert singer, and as president of the South Hills Choral Club. During World War I she substituted for a Pittsburgh church soloist who was called into military service; she was also a soloist at the city's YMCA celebration of the Fourth of July in 1918.

In New York, Weller performed concerts for radio. "I believe radio will have a marked effect on the people of tomorrow," she explained in a 1922 interview, "the children of today." She also wrote about music in essays such as "Music Aids His Return to Health" (1920) and "Songs Reflect Colors" (1921), in which she describes how a recital program is best assembled.

Weller was also interested in psychology. She gave an address on "The Psychology of Americanization" to the Psychology Club in Nashville, Tennessee, while she was in that city to perform. She also appeared as "guest of honor" of the Rotary Club in Nashville during her visit. In 1928 she was a leader of the New York chapters of Women of Mooseheart Legion, a women's auxiliary of the Loyal Order of Moose.

== Later years in Beaver ==
She moved back to her hometown in Pennsylvania in 1934; that year, she started a "morning musicale" club in Beaver. In the late 1930s, she chaired an annual juried art exhibit in Beaver, and raised money for arts education. In 1938 she was director of the Music and Art Center of Beaver County. She died in 1944, in her early sixties.
