= Victor Mravlag =

American physician

Victor Mravlag, MD was Mayor of Elizabeth, New Jersey who served multiple terms.

== Biography ==
He was also a physician who was instrumental in the development of the Elizabeth General Hospital and Dispensary. Mravlag was a member of the Union County Medical Society and a founding member of the Elizabeth General Hospital Clinical Society.

He died on May 15, 1934.
