= List of longest-serving United States mayors =

Some of the longest-serving mayors in the United States are listed according to their length of service in that currently or has served in that part of the state or legislative office. The office of mayor is the highest ranking local official and responsibilities may vary from ceremonial (see weak mayor) to full-time responsibility for city operations (see strong mayor).

== Serving mayors ==
A list of mayors still in office and ordered by their length of continuous service in that office. (If there is a break in their service, then this length is measured from their return to the office.)

Years	Name	Municipality	Notes
51 years, 178 days	Margaret M. Doud	Mackinac Island, Michigan	Entered office on April 14, 1975.
50 years, 277 days	Robert Heidenescher	Dupont, Ohio	Entered office on January 5, 1976.
38 years, 161 days	William D. Tate	Grapevine, Texas	Served from May 1, 1973 to May 1, 1985. Re-entered office on May 1, 1988.
50 years, 270 days	Lamar Scroggs	Oakwood, Georgia	Entered office on January 12, 1976.
49 years, 341 days	Harold Rainwater	Wilmore, Kentucky	Entered office on November 2, 1976.
50 years, 209 days	Rutledge B. Leland, III	McClellanville, South Carolina	Entered office on March 14, 1976.
48 years, 336 days	Robert Chatfield	Prospect, Connecticut	Entered office on November 7, 1977.
49 years, 271 days	Phil Williams	McLemoresville, Tennessee	Entered office on January 11, 1977. He is the longest serving mayor in Tennessee history.
45 years, 124 days	Mary Hawkins Butler	Madison, Mississippi	Entered office on June 7, 1981.
45 years, 158 days	Jeffery D. Schielke	Batavia, Illinois	Entered office on May 4, 1981.
45 years, 161 days	Gerald R. Bennett	Palos Hills, Illinois	Entered office in 1981.
45 years, 95 days	Mark Anthony McClure	Danville, West Virginia	Entered office on July 6, 1981.
44 years, 207 days	Johnny B. Thomas	Glendora, Mississippi	Entered office in March 16, 1982.
43 years, 342 days	James V. Bender Jr	Pollocksville, North Carolina	Entered office on November 1, 1982.
43 years, 100 days	Alan Haught	Harrisville, West Virginia	Entered office on July 1, 1983.
43 years, 26 days	William "Bill" McIntosh	Moultrie, Georgia	Entered office in September 13, 1983.
40–41 years	Louie Davis	Waldo, Florida	Entered office in 1985.
38 years	Dennis M. Clough	Westlake, Ohio	Entered office in 1986.
36 years, 100 days	Richard Turner	Weehawken, New Jersey	Entered office July 1, 1990
35 years, 337 days	Ravi Bhasker	Socorro, New Mexico	Entered office on November 6, 1990.
35 years, 281 days	James M. Cahill	New Brunswick, New Jersey	Entered office on January 1, 1991.
34–35 years	Mark Lauretti	Shelton, Connecticut	Entered office in 1991.
33 years, 281 days	J. Christian Bollwage	Elizabeth, New Jersey	Entered office on January 1, 1993.
32 years, 279 days	Dean J. Mazzarella	Leominster, Massachusetts	Entered office on January 3, 1994.

== Former mayors ==
A list of mayors in order of their total length of service. (If there is a break in their service, then this length is measured as the sum of their terms.)

Years	Name	Municipality	Notes
63 years, 73 days	Hilmar Moore	Richmond, Texas	Served from September 22, 1949, until his death on December 4, 2012.
61 years, 111 days	John H. Land	Apopka, Florida	Served from January 1, 1950, to January 1, 1968, and from January 1, 1971, to April 22, 2014.
60 years	Charles E. Long	Booneville, Kentucky	Served from 1958 until his death on August 3, 2019.
58 years, 233 days	Robert Linn	Beaver, Pennsylvania	Served from January 2, 1946, to August 22, 2004.
62 years, 261 days	Bruce Arnold	Valparaiso, Florida	Served from January 21, 1964, until his death on February 23, 2017.
56 years	Paul Jurko	Yankee Lake, Ohio	Served from November, 1931 until his death on March 1, 1988.
54 years, 270 days	Robert L. Butler	Marion, Illinois	Served from May 6, 1963 until his resignation on January 31, 2018.
52 years	Gerald Calabrese	Cliffside Park, New Jersey	Served from 1961 to 1963 and 1965 to 2015.
52 years	Frank Caliper	Colp, Illinois	Served from 1935 until his death on March 28, 1987.
52 years, 0 days	John M. Coyne	Brooklyn, Ohio	Served from 1948 to January 2000. (Note: The date of inauguration for Mayor John Coyne is not clear. It is clear that his successor, Kenneth Patton, took office in January 2000. References appear to confuse the 1999 election defeat with the day he left office. Most references state that he served 52 years, some from 1947–1999, a few from 1948 to 1999, and others from 1948 to 2000.)
51 years, 102 days	Donald Stephens	Rosemont, Illinois	First Mayor of Rosemont. Served from village's incorporation in 1956 to 2007.
51 years, 361 days	Robert M. Blais	Lake George, New York	Served from April 5, 1971, to April 1, 2023.
51 years, 182 days	Dock Hulett Gabbert	Derma, Mississippi	Served from July 1, 1969, to December 30, 2020.
50 years, 298 days	Leonard Scarcella	Stafford, Texas	Served from September 4, 1969, until his death on June 28, 2020.
50 years, 0 days	Leonard T. Connors	Surf City, New Jersey	Served from 1966 to January 5, 2016.
48 years, 352 days	Frank E. Rodgers	Harrison, New Jersey	Served from September 4, 1946, to August 22, 1995.
48 years, 19 days	Randall Wise	Niceville, Florida	Served from August, 1972 until his death on January 20, 2020.
48 years	John Lewis Gay	Berea, Kentucky	Served from 1910 to 1958.
47 years, 11 months	Frank Kelly	Collingdale, Pennsylvania	Served from 1970 until his death on November 22, 2018.
47 years, 115 days	Nicholas B. Blase	Niles, Illinois	Served from May 2, 1961, until his resignation on August 25, 2008.
47 years, 104 days	Milt Kramer	Manchester, Iowa	Served from September 19, 1974, to January 1, 2022.
43 years, 275 days	Noel B. Cummings	Hodgkins, Illinois	Served from 1979 until his formal retirement was announced on Oct. 3, 2022 at the age of 95.
46 years, 364 days	H. Ford Gravitt	Cumming, Georgia	Served from January 1, 1971, to December 31, 2017.
46 years, 222 days	Joseph Sieb	Norridge, Illinois	Served from November 14, 1951, until his death on June 23, 1998.
45 years	Marvin Johnson	Independence, Minnesota	First elected in November 1979, retired on January 7, 2025.
44 years	Charles "Sonny" Penhale	Helena, Alabama	Served from 1968 to 2012.
44 years	Thomas M. Tartt	Livingston, Alabama	Served from 1980 to February 22, 2024.
44 years	Gerald H. Thompson	Fitzgerald, Georgia	Served from January 1, 1968, to January 1, 2012.
45 years	Richard A. Mola	Elmwood Park, New Jersey	Served from 1972 until his death in 2016.
43 years, 0 days	Paul W. Cassidy	Parma Heights, Ohio	Served from January, 1958 to January, 2001.
42 years, 0 days	Tom Reid	Pearland, Texas	Served from 1978 to 1990 and 1993 to May, 2020.
44–45 years	Gary W. Starr	Middleburg Heights, Ohio	Entered office in 1981.
41 years, 146 days	Erastus Corning II	Albany, New York	Served from January 2, 1942, to May 28, 1983.
41 years, 239 days	Harold Wayne Ford	Galva, KS	Served from June 6, 1977, to January 31, 2019. He was the longest serving mayor of Galva, KS.
41 years	Glenn L. Sisco	Kinnelon, New Jersey	Served from 1969 to 2010.
40 years, 180 days	Duane Dawson	Milan, Illinois	Served from May 6, 1985, to November 3, 2025.
40 Years	Betty Duggan	Fieldon, IL	Served from 1981 - 2021
40 years	Dennis Satre	Hoffman, MN	Served from 1985 to 2025
40 years	George C. Clanton	Tappahannock, Virginia	Served from 1948 to 1988
40 years, 34 days	Michael S. Einhorn	Crete, Illinois	Served from April 8, 1985 to May 12, 2025
40 years, 27 days	Joseph P. Riley Jr.	Charleston, South Carolina	Served from December 15, 1975, to January 11, 2016.
39–40 years	Louis Bay 2nd	Hawthorne, New Jersey	Served from 1947 to 1987.
39 years, 363 days	William W. Dickinson Jr.	Wallingford, Connecticut	Served from January 2, 1984, to December 31, 2023.
39 years, 100 days	John Ferrero	City of Industry, California	Served from Industry's incorporation in 1957 till his death on September 26, 1996.
39 years	James B. Grant	Louisville, Alabama	Served from 1986 to 2025.
37–38 years	James Eagan	Florissant, Missouri	Served from 1963 to 2000.
36 years	Ross Aragon	Pagosa Springs, Colorado	Served from 1978 to 2014
36 years	Randall Ramsey	Parma, Missouri	Served from 1962 to 1974 and from 1991 to 2015.
35 years, 362 days	Orville L. Hubbard	Dearborn, Michigan	Served from 1942 to 1978.
35 years, 54 days	Edward J. Zabrocki	Tinley Park, Illinois	Served from May 1, 1981, until his resignation in June, 2016.
34–35 years	Willis Conner	Dexter, Missouri	Served for about 35 years.
34–35 years	Glendel Stephenson	Mebane, North Carolina	Served from 1975 to 1983 and 1993 to 2019.
34 years	F. Edward Biertuempfel	Union Township, Union County, New Jersey	Served from 1939 to 1973
33 years, 10 months	David W. Smith	Newark, California	Served from March 1978 to December 2011
33 years, 3 months	Joseph Barabe	Mellen, Wisconsin	Served from April 1987 to April 2001 and April 2003 to July 2022
33 years	Richard A. Nowack	Oak Grove, Illinois	Served from May 2, 1978 until his death on September 20, 2011.
33 years	Gary V. Gottschalk	Oakwood Village, Ohio	Served from 1992 until his death on Sept. 12, 2025
33 years	Joseph Smith	East Newark, New Jersey	Served from 1987 to 2020
32 years	Anthony Vacco	Evergreen Park, Illinois	Served from 1969 to 2001.
32 years	Shawn Hogan	Hornell, New York	Served from 1985 to 2017.
32 years	Kenneth J. Sims	Euclid, Ohio	Served from 1938 until his retirement in June 1970
31 years, 6 months	James A. Anzaldi	Clifton, New Jersey	Entered office July 1, 1990 and left office on December 31, 2022
30 years, 33 days	Frank Hague	Jersey City, New Jersey	Served from 1917 to 1947.
30 years	Richard Homrighausen	Dover, Ohio	Served from 1992 until his suspension from office in May 2022
30 years	Emmett Dofner Jr.	McClelland, Iowa	Served from 1987 until his death on May 2, 2017.
30 years	Glenn Lewis	Moore, Oklahoma	Served from 1994 until 2024
29 years, 354 days	Daniel R. Brooks	North College Hill, Ohio	Served from January 1, 1984, until his resignation on December 21, 2013
29 years, 201 days	Dr. LeRoy G. Suire	Erath, Louisiana	Served from 1961 to 1990.
29 years, 39 days	Willie Oswalt	Lake City, Georgia	Served from 1989 to 2018.
28 years, 321 days	Arnold Klentz	West Allis, Wisconsin	Served from April 18, 1944, until his death on March 5, 1973. (Note: Both sources agree that Klentz was inaugurated in 1944; West Allis gives a date of April 18. West Allis inaccurately gives Klentz's death date as March 1971, whereas the contemporary source cited gives it as March 5, 1973.)
28 years, 150 days	Don Plusquellic	Akron, Ohio	Served from January 1, 1987, until his resignation on May 31, 2015.
28 years, 4 days	James Brainard	Carmel, Indiana	Served from January 1, 1996 to January 4, 2024
28 years	Paul Amico	Secaucus, New Jersey	Served from 1964 to 1992.
28 years	Henry Clark	Stephenville, Texas	Served from 1928 to 1956.
28 years, 0 days	Henry Maier	Milwaukee, Wisconsin	Served from 1960 to 1988.
28 years	Walter A. Scott	Jackson, Mississippi	Served from 1917 to 1945.
28 years	Thomas Gerard Dunn	Elizabeth, New Jersey	1964 to 1992. At his retirement, Dunn was the longest-serving mayor of a city of more than 100,000 people; that record was eventually broken by his successor, J. Christian Bollwage.
28 years	George H. Lysle	McKeesport, Pennsylvania	Served from 1914 to 1942.
27 years, 364 days	Stephen R. Reed	Harrisburg, Pennsylvania	Served from 1982 to 2010.
27 years, 0 days	Don Robart	Cuyahoga Falls, Ohio	Served from 1986 to 2013.
26 years, 30 days	Miguel A. Pulido	Santa Ana, California	Served from 1994 to 2020.
26 years	Manuel Lamela Abreu	Quebradillas, Puerto Rico	Served from 1918 to 1944.
24 years	Timothy Hanna	Appleton, Wisconsin	Served From 1996 to 2020.
24 years	John Antaramian	Kenosha, Wisconsin	Served From 1992 to 2008 and 2016 to 2024.
23 years	John W. Preece	Delbarton, West Virginia	Served from 1997 to 2019, was reelected in 2023, dying during his term
