= J. Christian Bollwage =

American politician

Mayor of Elizabeth, New Jersey
- Incumbent
- Assumed office January 1, 1993
- Preceded by: Thomas G. Dunn

Personal details
- Born: James Christian Bollwage; December 7, 1954 (age 71) Elizabeth, New Jersey
- Party: Democratic
- Occupation: Adjunct Professor in the Public Administration Department at Kean University

James Christian (Chris) Bollwage is the mayor of Elizabeth, New Jersey, the state's fourth-largest city. A lifelong resident of Elizabeth, he was elected into his first term in 1992, and reelected in November 1996, 2000, 2004, 2008, 2012, 2016 and 2020. He has been the president of the New Jersey State League of Municipalities.

He is a 1972 graduate of St. Mary of the Assumption High School. He graduated from Kean University with a bachelor's degree in 1981 and with a master's degree in 1989. Kean University gave Bollwage an honorary degree in 2002. Bollwage is an adjunct professor in the Public Administration Department at Kean University.

Bollwage's vision of the future of Elizabeth included "Go-Green" initiatives, collegiate corridor concept, remodeling of Midtown train station, and expansion of economic development, recreation, housing and transportation. He also unveiled a foreclosure assistance program, a Healthy Elizabeth initiative and camera surveillance network.

In November of 2026, Bollwage was announced as the Grand Marshal of the 2027 Union County St. Patricks Day Parade. The Parade will take place on Saturday March 13 2027 on Morris Ave in Union Township.

== Social issues ==
In November 2026, body camera footage of an Elizabeth, New Jersey police lieutenant showed the police director Earl Graves present during the arrest of the campaign manager for a candidate for City Council in the 5th ward, Jose Rodriguez. POLITICO reported that "Graves was on hand for the entire hour-and-a-half confrontation — while keeping in touch with Mayor J. Christian Bollwage, who supported Rodriguez’s rival." The mayor's office did not respond to a request for comment.

2020 Elizabeth mayoral election
Party	Candidate	Votes	%
Democratic	Chris Bollwage (incumbent)	26,495	98.53
Write-in		394	1.47
Total votes		26,889	100.00
Democratic hold			

2016 Elizabeth mayoral election
Party	Candidate	Votes	%
Democratic	Chris Bollwage (incumbent)	20,732	99.68
Write-in		66	0.32
Total votes		20,798	100.00
Democratic hold			

2012 Elizabeth mayoral election
Party	Candidate	Votes	%
Democratic	Chris Bollwage (incumbent)	20,415	99.62
Write-in		78	0.38
Total votes		20,493	100.00
Democratic hold			

2008 Elizabeth mayoral election
Party	Candidate	Votes	%
Democratic	Chris Bollwage (incumbent)	18,929	80.21
Republican	Albert Martin	4,663	19.76
Write-in		7	0.03
Total votes		23,599	100.00
Democratic hold			

== See also ==
- List of longest-serving mayors in the United States
