= Beaver, Pennsylvania =

Borough in Pennsylvania, US

- Borough
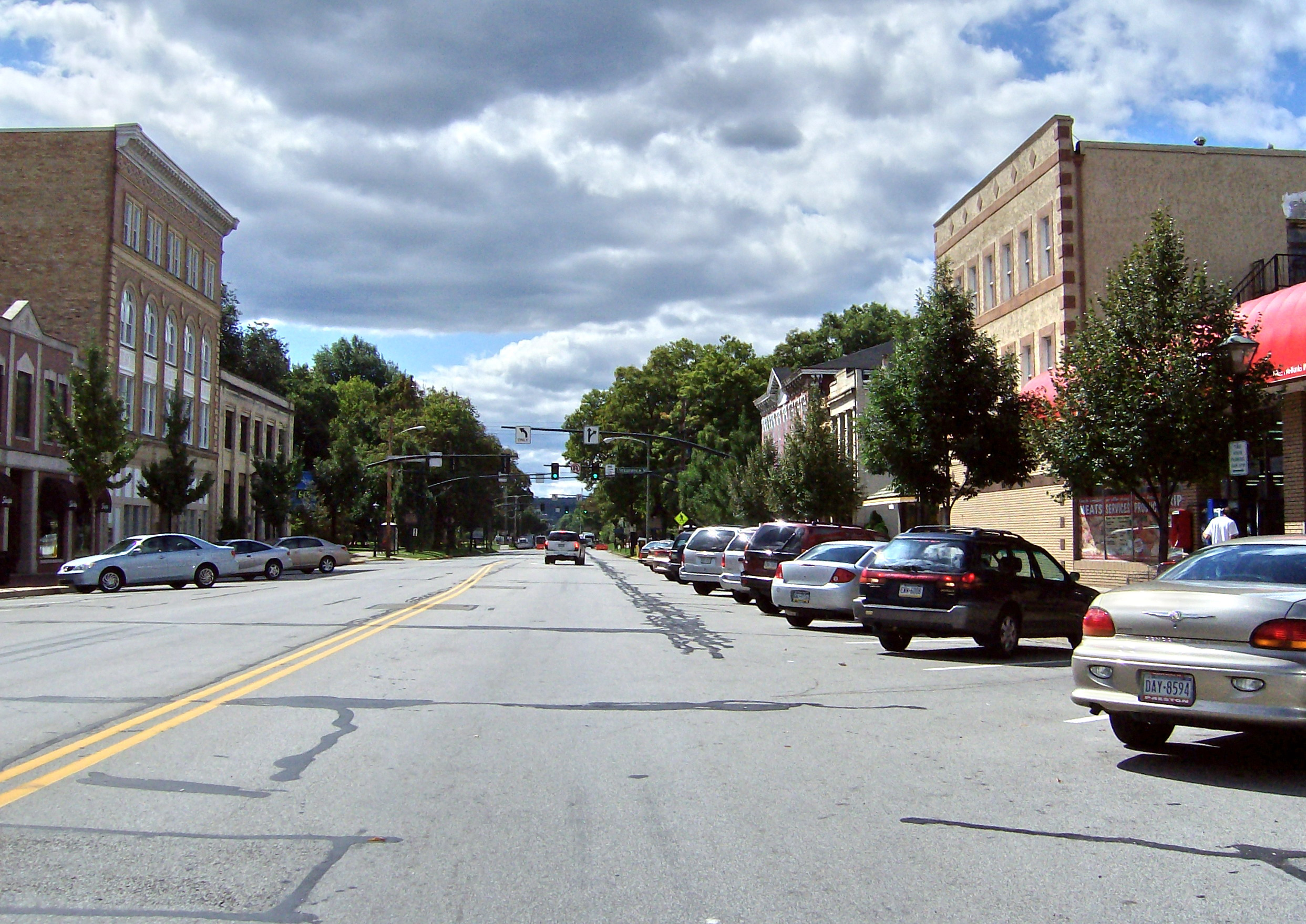
- Third Street (Pennsylvania Route 68) within the Beaver Historic District
- Interactive map of Beaver, Pennsylvania
- Location within Pennsylvania Location within the United States
- Coordinates: 40°41′41″N 80°18′27″W
- Country: United States
- State: Pennsylvania
- County: Beaver
- Settled: 1792
- Incorporated: 1802

Area
  - Total: 1.12 sq mi (2.91 km^{2})
  - Land: 0.92 sq mi (2.37 km^{2})
  - Water: 0.21 sq mi (0.54 km^{2})
- Elevation: 791 ft (241 m)

Population (2020)
  - Total: 4,438
  - Density: 4,850/sq mi (1,871/km^{2})
- Time zone: UTC-5 (Eastern (EST))
  - Summer (DST): UTC-4 (EDT)
- Zip Code: 15009
- Area code: 724
- FIPS code: 42-04688
- Website: https://www.beaverpa.us

Beaver is a borough in Beaver County, Pennsylvania, United States, and its county seat. It is located near the confluence of the Beaver and Ohio rivers, approximately 30 miles (48 km) northwest of Pittsburgh. The population was 4,438 at the 2020 census.

== History ==
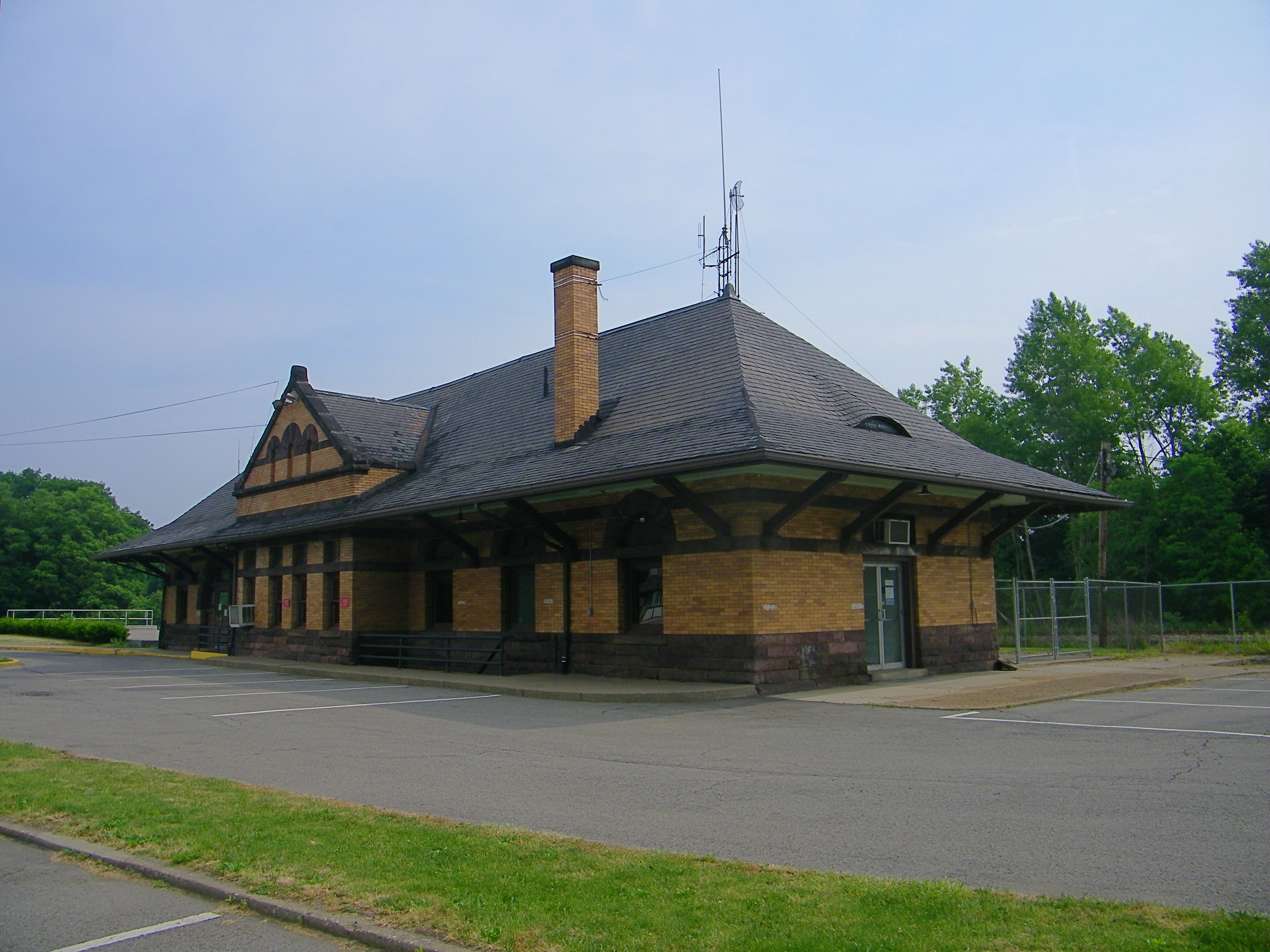
The 1897 Pittsburgh and Lake Erie Railroad station in Beaver

The area around Beaver was once home to Shawnee Indians, who were later displaced by groups such as the Mingoes and the Lenape. It was part of the Ohio Country that was in dispute during the French and Indian War.

Beaver became the site of Fort McIntosh, a Revolutionary War era Patriot frontier fort. After the war, the fort was the home of the First American Regiment, the oldest active unit in the US Army. The fort was abandoned in 1788 and razed a short time later. By then, the frontier had moved westward and there was no further need for a permanent garrison to protect the area.

The community was laid out in 1792. In 1800, it became the county seat of the newly formed Beaver County. The first county court was established in Beaver in 1804. Growth was steady until 1879 when the arrival of the Pittsburgh and Lake Erie Railroad caused a major growth spurt. In February 1884 a massive flood caused extensive damage. In 1974, an archeological excavation was conducted at the site of Fort McIntosh. The borough became a Tree City USA community in 1997.

Robert Linn was the mayor of Beaver for 58 years, from 1946 to 2004, making him one of the longest-serving mayors in the United States. In late 2007, local officials proposed the consolidation of Beaver with Brighton Township, although nothing came of the initiative.

== Geography ==
According to the U.S. Census Bureau, the borough has a total area of 1.1 square miles (2.8 km^{2}), of which 0.9 square miles (2.3 km^{2}) is land and 0.2 square miles (0.5 km^{2}) (13.89%) is water.

=== Surrounding and adjacent neighborhoods ===
Beaver borders three municipalities, with Brighton Township to the north, Bridgewater to the east, and Vanport Township to the west. Across the Ohio River to the south, Beaver runs adjacent with Monaca to the southeast, Center Township to the south, and Potter Township to the southwest.

== Demographics ==
Historical population
Census	Pop.	Note	%±
1820	361		—
1830	914		153.2%
1840	551		−39.7%
1850	2,054		272.8%
1860	817		−60.2%
1870	1,120		37.1%
1880	1,178		5.2%
1890	1,552		31.7%
1900	2,348		51.3%
1910	3,456		47.2%
1920	4,135		19.6%
1930	5,665		37.0%
1940	5,641		−0.4%
1950	6,360		12.7%
1960	6,160		−3.1%
1970	6,100		−1.0%
1980	5,441		−10.8%
1990	5,028		−7.6%
2000	4,775		−5.0%
2010	4,529		−5.2%
2020	4,438		−2.0%
2021 (est.)	4,698	▲	5.9%

=== 2020 census ===
As of the 2020 census, Beaver had a population of 4,438. The median age was 47.9 years. 18.3% of residents were under the age of 18 and 26.4% of residents were 65 years of age or older. For every 100 females there were 87.5 males, and for every 100 females age 18 and over there were 84.9 males age 18 and over.

100.0% of residents lived in urban areas, while 0.0% lived in rural areas.

There were 2,132 households in Beaver, of which 21.7% had children under the age of 18 living in them. Of all households, 42.6% were married-couple households, 17.7% were households with a male householder and no spouse or partner present, and 35.1% were households with a female householder and no spouse or partner present. About 41.5% of all households were made up of individuals and 21.4% had someone living alone who was 65 years of age or older.

There were 2,318 housing units, of which 8.0% were vacant. The homeowner vacancy rate was 1.7% and the rental vacancy rate was 9.2%.

Racial composition as of the 2020 census
Race	Number	Percent
White	4,059	91.5%
Black or African American	75	1.7%
American Indian and Alaska Native	3	0.1%
Asian	61	1.4%
Native Hawaiian and Other Pacific Islander	3	0.1%
Some other race	36	0.8%
Two or more races	201	4.5%
Hispanic or Latino (of any race)	96	2.2%

=== 2000 census ===
As of the 2000 census, there were 4,775 people, 2,112 households, and 1,260 families residing in the borough. The population density was 5,119 inhabitants per square mile (1,976/km^{2}). There were 2,297 housing units at an average density of 2,463 inhabitants per square mile (951/km^{2}). The racial makeup of the borough was 96.44% White, 2.64% African American, 0.13% Native American, 0.27% Asian, 0.27% from other races, and 0.25% from two or more races. Hispanic or Latino of any race were 0.88% of the population.

There were 2,112 households, out of which 23.2% had children under the age of 18 living with them, 49.6% were married couples living together, 8.1% had a female householder with no husband present, and 40.3% were non-families. 36.9% of all households were made up of individuals, and 19.9% had someone living alone who was 65 years of age or older. The average household size was 2.14 and the average family size was 2.83.

In the borough, the population was spread out, with 19.2% under the age of 18, 6.8% from 18 to 24, 26.7% from 25 to 44, 25.3% from 45 to 64, and 22.1% who were 65 years of age or older. The median age was 43 years. For every 100 females, there were 91.4 males. For every 100 females age 18 and over, there were 88.9 males.

The median income for a household in the borough was $42,113, and the median income for a family was $57,208. Males had a median income of $43,198 versus $26,709 for females. The per capita income for the borough was $24,003. About 3.7% of families and 4.9% of the population were below the poverty line, including 7.1% of those under age 18 and 2.2% of those age 65 or over.

== Arts and culture ==
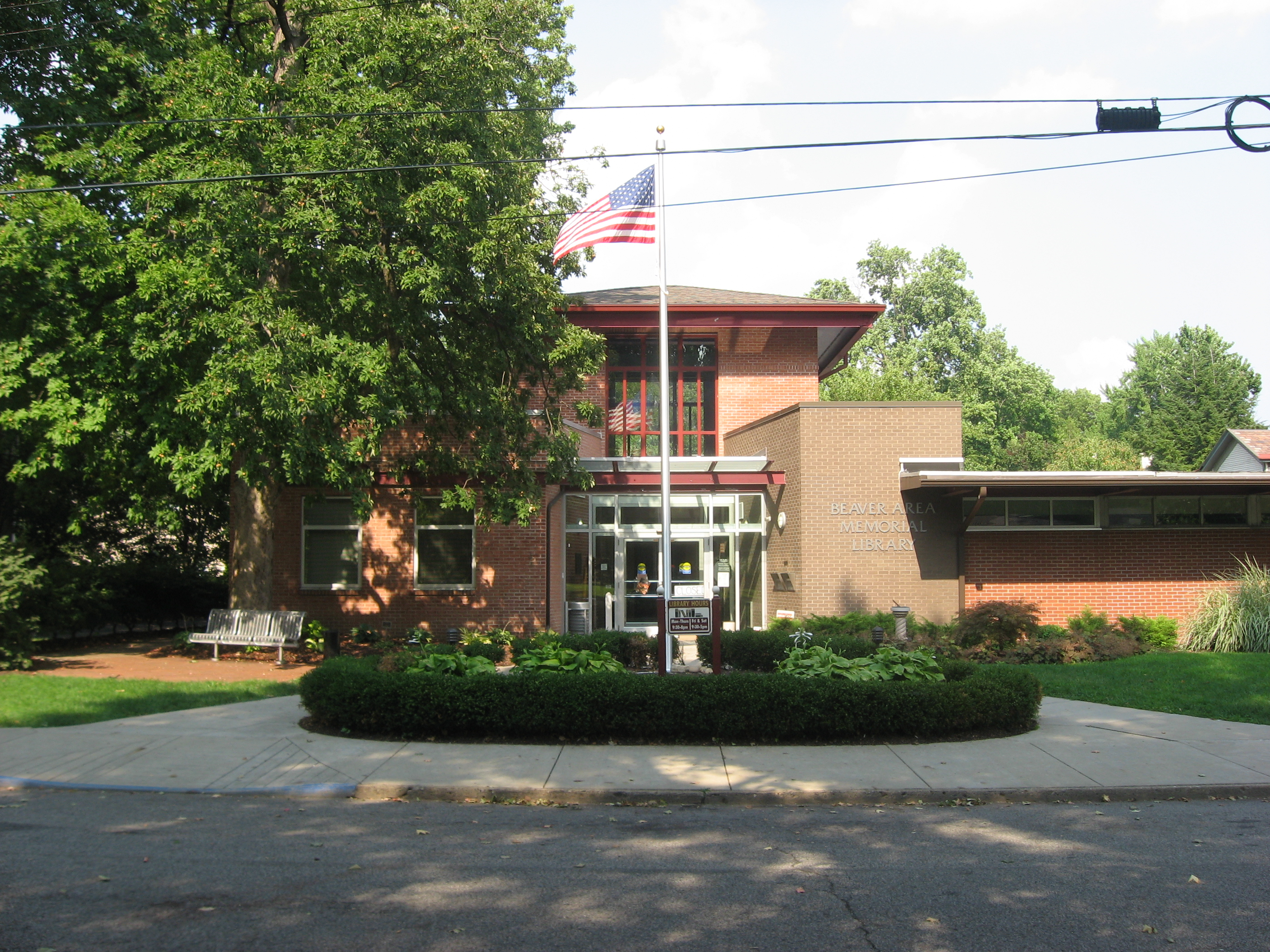
Beaver Area Memorial Library

=== Beaver Historic District ===
In 1996, almost the entire community was listed on the National Register of Historic Places as a historic district. Centered on Beaver's commercial Third Street, the buildings in the Beaver Historic District date primarily to the nineteenth century, although some twentieth-century structures are present. Some of the district's most prominent buildings are five churches and the county courthouse, although most of the district consists of residential neighborhoods. Included in the boundaries of the district is the Matthew S. Quay House, the National Historic Landmark home of Beaver native Senator Matthew Quay, and the site of Fort McIntosh, a fort constructed in the 1780s.

=== Library ===
The Beaver Area Memorial Library started as a small collection of books in the basement of the Beaver Trust Co. in the 1940s and was run by the Beaver Civic Club. It eventually moved into the basement of a former high school on College Avenue in Beaver. In 1948, the Beaver County courts granted a charter for the official formation of the Beaver Memorial Library. A fundraiser was started in Beaver County in 1961 to raise the $130,000 to build a new establishment. The new building, which continues to serve as the public library today, was officially dedicated on April 8, 1962, and open to the public.

== Education ==
Children in Beaver are served by the Beaver Area School District, which includes two elementary schools, one middle school and Beaver Area High School.

== Notable people ==
- Daniel Agnew, Chief Justice of the Supreme Court of Pennsylvania
- John Allison, lawyer and United States Congressman
- Rudyerd Boulton, ornithologist
- Louise Tanner Brown, businesswoman
- Robert Linn, mayor of Beaver for 58 years and one of the longest-serving mayors in the U.S.
- Amber Mariano, winner of Survivor: All-Stars
- Nate Martin, co-founder & CEO of Puzzle Break, first American Escape Room company
- Tom McCreery, Major League Baseball player
- Matthew Quay, United States Senator
- Harrison Holt Richardson, youngest member of the United States Antarctic Service Expedition
- Nina Chermak Rosenberg, American costume designer
- Ralph Francis Scalera, judge of the United States District Court for the Western District of Pennsylvania
- Jeff Shaver, former Major League Baseball player
- John Skorupan, former NFL Linebacker for the Buffalo Bills and the New York Giants
- W. E. Clyde Todd, ornithologist
- Ida Geer Weller, concert singer and clubwoman
- Florence Wickham, contralto opera singer

== See also ==
- List of cities and towns along the Ohio River
