= Matthew S. Quay House =

Historic house in Pennsylvania, United States

- U.S. National Register of Historic Places
- U.S. National Historic Landmark
- U.S. Historic district – Contributing property
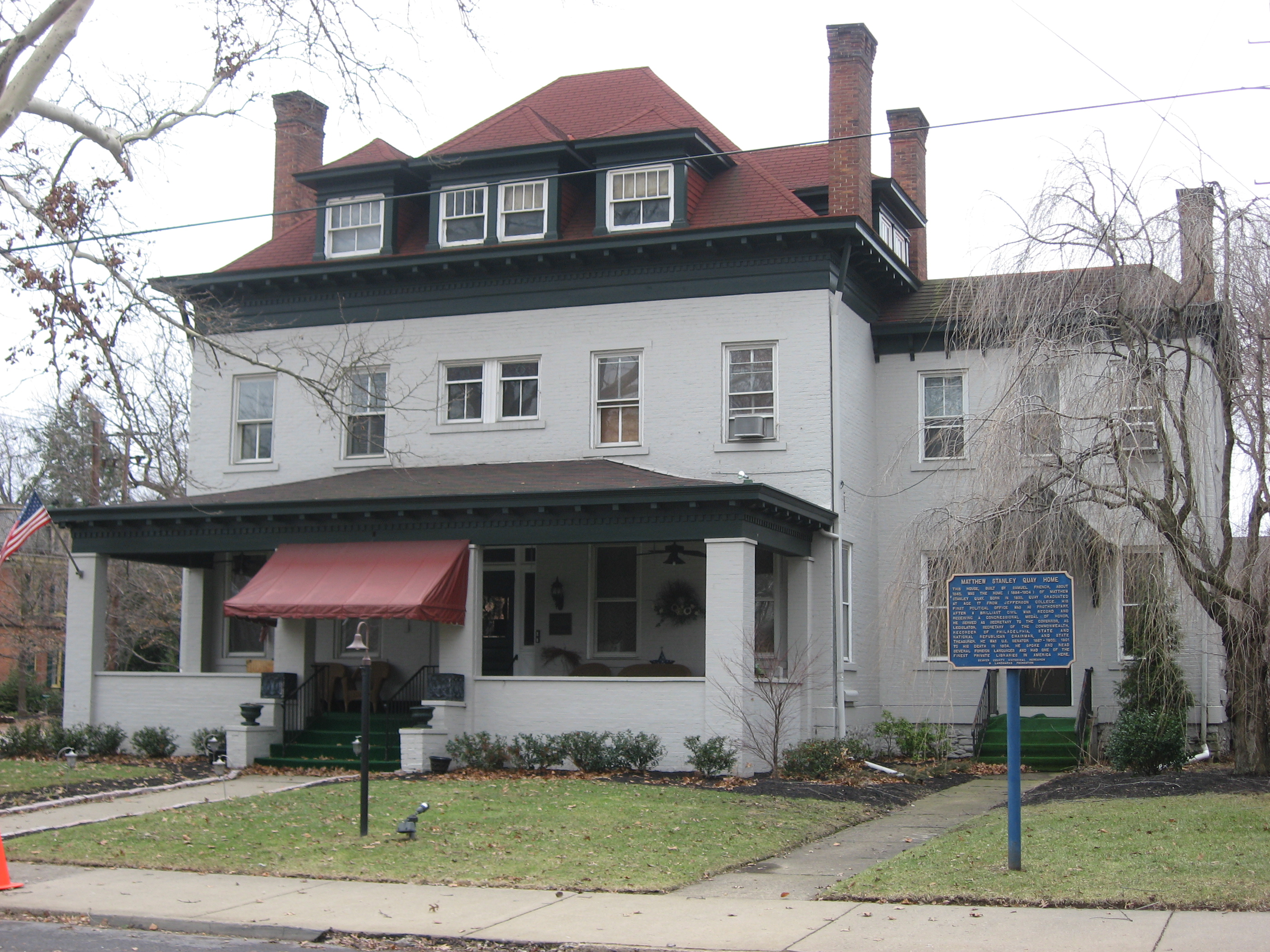
- Streetside view of the Quay House

- Location within Pennsylvania Location within the United States
- Location: 205 College Ave., Beaver, Pennsylvania
- Coordinates: 40°41′37″N 80°18′15″W
- Area: less than one acre
- Built: c. 1865
- Part of: Beaver Historic District (ID96001201)
- NRHP reference No.: 75001615

Significant dates
- Added to NRHP: May 15, 1975
- Designated NHL: May 15, 1975

The Matthew S. Quay House is a historic house at 205 College Avenue in Beaver, Pennsylvania. Built sometime after the American Civil War, it was from 1874 until his death the home of Matthew Stanley Quay (1833–1904), a United States senator and one of the most influential political party bosses of the late 19th century. His house was declared a National Historic Landmark in 1975. It was the location of the J.T. Anderson Funeral Home. However, now it is home to Covenant Financial Advisors.

== Description and history ==
The Matthew S. Quay House is south of Beaver's downtown, at the northwest corner of College Avenue and 2nd Street. It is a 2 1/2-story masonry structure, built of painted brick and covered by a hip roof. A single-story porch extends across the front facade, supported by brick columns. Both the porch and main roof have eaves with carved wooden brackets. The roof on each side is pierced by hip-roofed dormers. There is a small ell projecting to the north (right), and a longer one to the rear, the latter a probable alteration by Matthew Stanley Quay.

The house was probably built not long after the American Civil War, and was purchased by Quay in 1874. It would remain his primary residence until his death in 1904. Quay was trained as a lawyer and served in the Union Army during the war, winning a Medal of Honor for action in the Battle of Fredericksburg. He first became involved in politics in the 1850s, becoming a potent leader of the Republican Party in western Pennsylvania. He joined with the political machine of Simon Cameron, and eventually gained full control of the state party apparatus, which won him election to the U.S. Senate in 1887. In 1888 he chaired the presidential campaign of Benjamin Harrison, the most expensive presidential campaign up to then. Quay was open about patronage politics, which Harrison snubbed after winning the office. Quay worked against Harrison's renomination in 1892, with Harrison losing the general election to Grover Cleveland. Quay was reported to resort to bribery and dirty tricks in his activities, particularly in the 1888 race.

== See also ==
- Roberts-Quay House
- List of National Historic Landmarks in Pennsylvania
- National Register of Historic Places listings in Beaver County, Pennsylvania
