= Mayor of Elizabeth, New Jersey =

Mayor of Elizabeth, New Jersey:

- J. Christian Bollwage 1992 to present
- Thomas Gerard Dunn (1921–1998) 1964 to 1992. He was the nation's longest-serving mayor of a city of more than 100,000 people.
- Steven J. Bercik (?-2003) 1956 to 1964.
- Nicholas Saint LaCorte (1919–1966) 1953-1955.
- James T. Kirk (mayor) (1896–1974) 1939-1952.
- Joseph A. Brophy 1935-1939
- Thomas Williams (mayor) 1933-1935
- John F. Kenah 1922-1932
- Victor Mravlag 1913-1923
- Alfred A. Stein 1911-1913
- Victor Mravlag 1909-1911
- Patrick J. Ryan (mayor) 1907-1909
- Samuel J. Berry 1905-1907
- Patrick J. Ryan (mayor) 1901-1905
- William A.M. Mack (1857–1901) 1898 - January 14, 1901. He died in office.
- John C. Rankin, Jr. 1890-1898
- Joseph H. Grier January 1, 1883 to 1890
- Seth B. Ryder January 1, 1882 to January 1, 1883.
- Peter Bennett (mayor) January 1, 1880 to January 1, 1882.
- Robert W. Townley January 1, 1879, to January 1, 1880.
- James S. Green (mayor) January 1, 1878 to January 1, 1879.
- Robert W. Townley January 1, 1875 to January 1, 1878.
- William A. Coursen January 1, 1873 to January 1, 1875.
- Francis Barber Chetwood II January 1, 1871 to January 1, 1873.
- Philip H. Grier May 1, 1862 to January 1, 1871.
- James B. Burnet May 1, 1861 to May 1, 1862.
- James Jenkins (mayor) May 1, 1860 to May 1, 1861.
- Elias Darby May 1, 1855 to May 1, 1860. He was the first mayor of the newly incorporated city of Elizabeth, New Jersey.
- Elias Darby 1853 to May 1, 1855. He was the last mayor of Elizabethtown.
- Francis Barber Chetwood 1851 to 1853.
- Edward Sanderson 1847 to 1851.
- Francis Barber Chetwood 1846 to 1847.
- Elias Winans 1845 to 1846.
- David Naar 1842-1845
- William Chetwood (1771–1857) 1839 to 1842.
- Smith Scudder 1838 to 1839.
- Stephan P. Brittan 1833 to 1838.
- Isaac Halstead Williamson (1768–1844) 1830 to 1833. He died in office.
- Caleb Halsted, Jr. 1825-1830
- Unknown 1823 to 1825
- Jeremiah Ballard 1822 - 4 Sep 1823. He died in office.
- Caleb Halsted, Jr. 1805-1822
- Elias Dayton 1795-1805
- John De Hart (1727–1795) 1789 to June 1, 1795. He died in office.
- Samuel Crane (mayor) 1788-1789
- From 1776 to 1788 there was no representative
- William Peartree Smith 1774-1776
- Stephen Crane 1772-1774
- John De Hart 1762-1772
- Samuel Woodruff 1748-1762
- Joseph Bonnell (mayor) 1739 - 14 March 1748. He died in office.
