= Robert Linn (politician) =

American mayor

Robert P. Linn

Mayor of Beaver, Pennsylvania
- In office January 2, 1946 – August 22, 2004
- Succeeded by: Thomas Hamilton

Personal details
- Born: December 27, 1908 Burgettstown, Pennsylvania
- Died: August 22, 2004 (aged 95) Beaver, Pennsylvania
- Party: Republican

Robert P. Linn (December 27, 1908 – August 22, 2004) was among the longest-serving mayors in the United States. Linn, a Republican, served 58 years as the mayor of Beaver, Pennsylvania, a borough around 25 miles (40 km) northwest of Pittsburgh.

== Biography ==
Linn was born in Burgettstown and grew up in Beaver. He worked for the Duquesne Light Company, and in 1945 was approached by a group of Republicans who wanted to defeat the incumbent mayor, a position then known as burgess. Initially, he did not want the job, but later gave in. Afterward he changed his mind, taking out a newspaper advertisement telling people to vote for his opponent. He won the election anyway and took office on January 2, 1946. Linn continued to serve as mayor for the next five decades. The position's original salary was $2,500 per year.

In 1995, he was officially listed in Guinness Book of World Records as the longest-serving mayor in the United States; in a 2002 interview, he said his major accomplishment in office was starting Streetscape, a town beautification project that replaced concrete sidewalks with red bricks and removed power lines from the main street.

Linn died in his sleep at his home in 2004 at the age of 95 and in the middle of his fifteenth term. The town council appointed councilman Thomas Hamilton to replace him.

He resided in a yellow apartment on Wilson Ave.

== Sources ==
- Associated Press (2004-08-24). "Robert P. Linn, Country's Longest-Serving Mayor". The San Diego Union-Tribune.
- Bradford, Harry (2003-05-28). "In 58 years, Beaver mayor has seen it all". Beaver Valley Star.
- Smith, Pohla (2004-08-24). "Obituary: Robert Linn / Mayor of Beaver Borough for a record 58 years". Pittsburgh Post-Gazette. Archived from the original on August 25, 2004.
- Vidonic, Bill (2004-08-27). "Beaver says farewell to Linn". Beaver County Times/Allegheny Times.
- "Longtime Pennsylvania Mayor Dies in Office". National Public Radio. 2004-08-24.
