= Young (surname) =

Young is an English surname derived from Old English geong meaning "young". This surname was used as a descriptive name to distinguish father from son.

In some cases, Young is a romanization of the Chinese surname Yang (simplified Chinese: 杨; traditional Chinese: 楊). It may also be a rare romanization of the Korean surnames Yong (용; 龍) or Yeong (영; 永/榮/影), though in Korean names, Young is more commonly part of a given name rather than a surname.

Young is the 34th most common surname in the USA, 49th most common in England & Wales, and 19th most common in Scotland.

Notable individuals with the surname Young include:

== A ==
- Ace Young (born 1980), singer and American Idol (Season 5) finalist from Colorado, United States
- Adam Young (disambiguation), several people
- Adrian Young (born 1969), American member of the band No Doubt
- Adrian Young (American football) (born 1946), American football player
- Adrian Young (footballer) (1943–2020), Australian rules footballer
- Adrienne Young, American singer-songwriter from Nashville
- Al Young, American poet, novelist, essayist, screenwriter, and professor
- Alan Young, British-born Canadian-American actor, comedian, and radio and television host
- Sir Alban Young, 9th Baronet (1865–1944), British envoy to Central America and to Balkan countries
- Aleana Young, Canadian politician
- Alex Young (disambiguation), several people
- Alexander Young (disambiguation), several people
- Alfred Young (mathematician) (1873–1940), British mathematician
- Alfred Young (artist) (born 1936), English conceptual and visual artist
- Alfred F. Young (1925–2012), American historian
- Alfred Karney Young (1864–1942), British barrister, judge, and cricketer
- Alf Young (1905–1977), English football manager and footballer for Huddersfield Town
- Alf Young (footballer, born 1900) (1900–1975), English footballer of the 1920s
- Al Young (dragster driver) (1946–2022), American former drag racer
- Allen Young (1827–1915), English master mariner and explorer
- Allen Young (writer) (born 1941), American journalist and writer
- Allyn Abbott Young (1876–1929), American economist
- Alse Young (1615–1647), American alleged witch
- Alton Milford Young (1884–1950), American leader of the Ku Klux Klan
- Alvin Young (born 1975), American expatriate professional basketball player
- Amanda Young, fictional character in the Saw film series
- Amita Marie Young (born 1980), Thai singer and actress
- Ammi B. Young (1798–1874), American architect
- Dr. Dre (born Andre Young in 1965), American rapper/hip-hop producer
- Andre Young (American football) (born 1960), football player
- Andre Young (basketball) (born 1990), American basketball player
- Andrew Young (disambiguation), several people
- Angus Young (born 1955), lead guitarist of the Australian band AC/DC
- Anna Irwin Young (1873–1920), American mathematician
- Annabel Young (born 1956), New Zealand politician
- Anne Sewell Young (1871–1961), American astronomer and professor
- Anthony Young (American football) (born 1963), American NFL defensive back
- Anthony Young (baseball) (1966–2017), American Major League Baseball pitcher
- Anthony Young (cyclist) (1900–1970), American Olympic cyclist
- Anthony Young (musician) (1683–1747), English organist and composer
- Anthony Young, Baron Young of Norwood Green (born 1942), British politician and Labour Party life peer
- Anthony M. Young (born 1943), Australian mycologist
- Anthony W. Young (1866–1948), Florida politician
- Archie Young (disambiguation), several people
- Aretas William Young (1778–1835), British Army officer and colonial administrator of the early nineteenth century
- Arthur Young (disambiguation), several people
- Artie Young (fl. 1930s–1940s), African-American dancer and actress
- Ashley Young (born 1985), English football player
- Audrey Young (1922–2012), American actress
- Austin Young (born 1966), American artist/photographer
- Avery Young (born 1992), American football player

== B ==
- Barbara Young (disambiguation), several people
- Barbara Young, Baroness Young of Old Scone (born 1948), British politician
- Bellamy Young (born 1970), American television actress and singer
- Bert Young (Herbert Young, 1899–1976), English footballer
- Bill Young (1930–2013), Florida congressman
- Bill Young (New Zealand politician) (1913–2009), New Zealand politician
- Bob Young (businessman), Canadian CEO of Red Hat
- Brad Young (disambiguation), several people
- Brandon Young (disambiguation), several people
- Brian Young (drummer), American member of Fountains of Wayne
- Brigham Young (1801–1877), American second President of The Church of Jesus Christ of Latter-day Saints
- Brigham Young Jr. (1836–1903), son of the above, American missionary and church leader
- Britney Young (born c.1987), American actress
- Bryan Young (disambiguation), several people
- Bryant Young (born 1972), American football player
- Bryce Young (born 2001), American football player
- Buddy Young (1926–1983), American football player
- Burt Young (1940–2023), American actor
- Byron Young (disambiguation), multiple people

== C ==
- Cameron Young (born 1997), American professional golfer
- Cameron Young (American football) (born 2000), American football player
- Cameron Young (basketball) (born 1996), American basketball player
- Carey Young (born 1970), British artist
- Carleton Young (1905–1994), American actor
- Carl Young (storm chaser) (1968–2013), American meteorologist and storm chaser
- Carlson Young (born 1990), American actress
- Cathy Young (born 1963), American journalist
- Charle Young (born 1951), American football tight end
- Charles Augustus Young (1834–1908), American astronomer
- Charles Burney Young (1824–1904), South Australian pastoralist and politician
- Charles E. Young (1931–2023), chancellor of UCLA (1968–1997), president of the University of Florida (1999–2003)
- Charley Young (born 1952), American football running back in the National Football League
- Charlie Young (disambiguation), several people
- Chase Young (born 1999), American football player
- Chase Young (cricketer) (born 1988), South African cricket player
- Chavez Young (born 1997), Bahamian professional baseball player
- Chic Young (1901–1973), American cartoonist who created the popular, long-running comic strip Blondie
- Chris Young (disambiguation), several people
- Christopher Young (born 1957), American film and television composer
- Cliff Young (disambiguation), several people
- Clinton Young (born 1986), Australian rules footballer
- Colbie Young (born 2002), American football player
- Cole Young (born 2003), American baseball player
- Coleman Young (1918–1997), former mayor of Detroit
- Colville Young (born 1932), Governor General of Belize
- Craig Young (disambiguation), multiple people
- Curt Young (born 1960), Major League Baseball pitcher and the pitching coach for the Boston Red Sox
- Curtis Young (born 1986), American football member of the National Football League
- Cy Young (1867–1955), American Major League Baseball Hall-of-Fame pitcher

== D ==
- Damon Young, Australian philosopher
- Daniel Young (cricketer) (born 1990), English cricketer
- Danny Young (basketball) (born 1962), American basketball player
- Danny Young (actor) (born 1986), UK actor
- Danny Young (pitcher, born 1971), American baseball player
- Danny Young (pitcher, born 1994), American baseball player
- Dareke Young (born 1999), American football player
- Darin Young (born 1973), American darts player
- Darren Young (disambiguation), several people
- Darrel Young (born 1987), American football fullback
- Darwin Young (1924–2020), American politician
- David Young (disambiguation), several people
- David Young, Baron Young of Graffham (1932–2022), British Conservative politician and businessman
- Dean Young (disambiguation), several people
- Delwyn Young (born 1982), American baseball player
- Delmon Young (born 1985), baseball player
- Derek Young (born 1980), Scottish professional footballer
- Desi-Rae Young (born c. 2002), American basketball player
- Dmitri Young (born 1973), baseball player
- Donald Young (disambiguation), several people
- Don Young (1933–2022), Alaskan politician
- Donald Young (baseball) (born 1945), baseball player
- Donald Young (tennis) (born 1989), professional tennis player from the United States
- Doug Young (politician) (born 1940), Canadian politician
- Doug Young (ice hockey) (1908–1990), former ice hockey defenceman
- Draff Young, former National Basketball Association coach

== E ==
- Earl Young (architect) (1889–1975), American architect
- Earl Young (athlete) (born 1941), American sprinter
- Earl Young (drummer) (born 1940), American drummer
- Ed Young (illustrator) (1931–2023), Chinese-born American children's illustrator
- Homer Edwin Young (Ed Young Sr., born 1936), American pastor
- Edwin Barry Young (Ed Young Jr., born 1961), American pastor
- Edward Young (disambiguation), several people, including:
  - Edward Young (1683–1765), English poet
- Eleanor Anne Young (1925–2007), American research scientist and educator
- Emily Young (disambiguation), several people
- Ephraim W. Young, Wisconsin pioneer, politician
- Eric Young (born 1985), guitarist/vocalist of the Canadian rock band Still Life Still
- Eric Young Jr. (born 1985), American baseball player and coach
- Eric Young Sr. (born 1967), American baseball player and coach
- Ernest Young (disambiguation), several people
- Esme Young (born 1949), English fashion designer
- Esther Young (1717–1795), English operatic contralto
- Ethel Louise Young (1883–1974), better known as Mary Forbes, British-American actress
- Evelyn Young (1915–1983), American film actress
- Ewing Young (1799–1841), American fur trapper and trader

== F ==
- Faron Young (1932–1996), American country music singer
- Fernanda Young (1970−2019), Brazilian writer, television presenter, and actress
- Fifi Young (1914–1975), Indonesian actress
- Francis Brett Young (1884–1954), English novelist, poet, playwright, and composer
- Frank A. Young (sportswriter) (1884–1957), American journalist and sportswriter
- Fred Young (disambiguation), several people
- Fredd Young (born 1961), professional American football linebacker
- Freddie Young (1902–1998), British cinematographer
- Frederick Young (disambiguation), several people

== G ==
- Gale J. Young (1912–1990), American nuclear engineer
- Galen Young (1975–2021), American professional basketball player
- Gary Young (disambiguation), several people
- Geoff Young (born 1956), American perennial candidate
- George Young (disambiguation), several people
- Gerald Young (disambiguation), several people
- G. M. Young (1882–1959), British historian
- Gig Young (1913–1978), American actor
- Gordon Young (artist) (active 1992–), British artist
- Grace Chisholm Young (1868–1944), British mathematician
- Graham Young (1947–1990), British serial killer
- Greg Young (disambiguation), several people
- Gruffydd Young (1370–1435), cleric and a close supporter of Owain Glyndwr during his Welsh rebellion

== H ==
- H. Olin Young (1850–1917), U.S. politician from Michigan
- Harold Young (disambiguation), several people
- Harriet Maitland Young (1838–1923), British composer
- Harry Young (disambiguation), several people
- Henry Young (disambiguation), several people
- Herbert J. Young, American college basketball and football coach
- Horace C. Young (1806–1879), New York politician
- Howard Young (disambiguation), several people

== I ==
- Irad Young (born 1971), American-Israeli soccer player
- Iris Marion Young (1949–2006), American political theorist
- Irwin Young (1927–2022), American businessman
- Ivonne Young (1943–2025), Panamanian politician
- Izzy Young (1928–2019), American folk music promoter

== J ==
- Jack Young (disambiguation), several people
- Jackie Young (disambiguation), several people
- Jacob Young (disambiguation), several people
- Jahmar Young (born 1986), American basketball player in the Israeli National League
- Jake Young (American football) (1968–2002), American football player
- James Young (disambiguation), several people
- Jane Young (disambiguation), several people
- Jared Young (born 1995), Canadian baseball player
- Jason Young (born 1980), Thai actor and singer
- Jason Young (born 1981), American discus thrower
- Jeff Young (born 1962), American guitarist
- Jeremy Young (1934–2022), British actor
- Jerome Young (born 1976), American sprint athlete
- Jess Young (1851–1909), English traveller and Australian explorer
- Jesse Colin Young (1941–2025), American singer and songwriter
- Jessie Young (1900–1987), American radio commentator and magazine publisher
- Jim Young (disambiguation), several people
- Jimmy Young (1918–1974), Northern Irish comedian and actor
- Jo-Anne H. Young, American physician, scientist, and journal editor
- Joe Young (disambiguation), several people
- John Young (disambiguation), several people
- Johnny Young (disambiguation), several people
- Jonathan Young (disambiguation), several people, includes Jonathon and Johnathan
- Jørgen Young (1781–1837), Norwegian politician
- Joseph Young (disambiguation), several people
- Josiah T. Young (1831–1907), American politician and newspaper editor
- Julia Evelyn Ditto Young (1857–1915), American novelist, poet
- Jordan Young (pornographic actor) (born 1977), American actor, model, and television executive
- Juwon Young (born 1996), American football player

== K ==
- Kakani Katija Young, American bioengineer
- Katherine Young (centenarian) (1901–2005), American centenarian, world's oldest Internet user
- Kay Young (born 1944), Canadian politician
- Kenny Young (1941–2020), American songwriter, artist, and producer
- Kenny Young (American football) (born 1995), American football player
- Keone Young (born 1947), American character actor
- Kevin Young (disambiguation), several people
- Killian Young (born 1987), Irish sportsperson
- Kimani Young, American men's basketball coach
- Kirsty Young (born 1968), British television presenter
- Kit Young (born 1994), British actor
- Korleone Young (born 1978), American professional basketball player
- Kristeen Young, American singer, songwriter and keyboardist

== L ==
- Lafayette Young (1848–1926), American newspaper reporter, editor, and Senator from Iowa
- La Monte Young (born 1935), American musician and composer
- Landon Young (born 1997), American football player
- Lauren Young (born 1993), Filipino-American actress model and singer
- Laurence Chisholm Young (1905–2000), British mathematician
- Lee Thompson Young (1984–2013), American actor
- Leon Young (1916–1991), conductor, arranger of Stranger on the Shore
- Leon Young (1924–2001). American politician
- Leon Young (born 1967), former police officer and member of the Wisconsin State Assembly
- Lester Young (1909–1959), American musician
- Linda Young (born 1953), American voice actress
- Logan Young (1940–2006), American businessman
- Lonnie Young (born 1963), American football player
- Loretta Young (1913–2000), American actress
- Luke Young (disambiguation), several people

== M ==
- Mabel Minerva Young (1872–1963), American mathematician
- Madison Young (born 1980), American pornographic actress and director
- Mae Young (1923–2014), American professional wrestler and WWE Ambassador
- Mahonri Young (1877–1957), American sculptor
- Mal Young (born 1957), British television producer and executive producer
- Malcolm Young (1953–2017), Scottish-born Australian guitarist and songwriter, member of the rock band AC/DC
- Margaret Young (disambiguation), several people
- Marie Grice Young (1876–1959), American passenger on the RMS Titanic and a piano teacher
- Marissa Young (born 1981), American softball coach, head coach at Duke University
- Mark Aitchison Young (1886–1974), 21st governor of Hong Kong
- Martha Strudwick Young (1862–1941), American author
- Martin Young (journalist) (1947–2024), British television journalist
- Marvin Young (born 1967), American rapper better known by his stage name Young MC
- Marvin R. Young (1947–1968), American soldier
- Megan Young (born 1990), Filipino-American actress
- Melissa Ann Young, 2005 Miss USA pageant contestant
- Michael Young (disambiguation), several people
- Milton Young (1897–1983), United States politician
- Mitch Young (born 1961), American football player
- Morris Young (entomologist) (1822–1897), Scottish entomologist
- Morris A. Young, sheriff of Gadsden County, Florida from 2004

== N ==
- Naomi Young (born 1976), Australian synchronized swimmer
- Nat Young (disambiguation), several people, includes Nathan Young
- Ned Young (1766–1800), sailor on HMS Bounty
- Nedrick Young (1914–1968), American actor and screenwriter, often blacklisted during the 1950s and 1960s
- Neil Young (disambiguation), several people
- Neville Young (1940–2019), New Zealand lawyer, National Party president
- Nicholas Young (disambiguation), several people
- Nick Young (disambiguation), several people
- Noreen Young (1939–2025), Canadian puppeteer and puppet builder

== O ==
- Olive Young (1903–1940), American-born actress in China
- Oliver Young (1855–1908), British politician
- Otto Young (1844–1906), German American businessman
- Owen D. Young (1874–1962), American founder of RCA and diplomat; Time Man of the Year for 1929

== P ==
- Paul Young (disambiguation), several people
- Patric Young (born 1992), American basketball player
- Patrick Young (1584–1652), Scottish scholar and librarian
- Pegi Young (1952–2019), American singer-songwriter
- Perry Deane Young (1941–2019), American journalist and writer
- Peter Young (disambiguation), several people
- Phineas Young (1799–1879), American early convert in the Latter Day Saint movement
- Polly Young (1749–1799), English soprano, composer, harpsichordist
- Polly Ann Young (1908–1997), American actress
- Priscilla Young (1925–2006), English social worker

== R ==
- R. Michael Young, politician in Indiana, United States
- Rachel Young, several characters
- Ralph Young (disambiguation), several people
- Randy Young (born 1954), American football player
- Rebecca Young (flag maker), flag maker during the American Revolution
- Rebecca Young (American politician) (1934–2008), Wisconsin politician and legislator
- Rebecca Young (Australian politician)
- Rebecca Jordan-Young (born 1963), American sociomedical scientist
- Reggie Young (1936–2019), lead guitarist in the American Sound Studios Band and a session musician
- Reynold K. Young (1886–1973), Canadian astronomer
- Richard Young (disambiguation), several people
- Rik Young (born 1978), English actor and dancer
- Robert Young (disambiguation), several people
- Robin Young (civil servant), British civil servant
- Robin Young, American television and radio personality
- Roby Young (born 1942), Israeli association football player
- Rod Young, Australian journalist and news presenter
- Roger Young (disambiguation), several people
- Roland Young (1887–1953), English actor
- Rolande Maxwell Young (1927–2015), American composer, pianist and educator
- Ronald N. Young, American politician
- Ronnie Young (1943–2019), American politician
- Rory Young (1972–2021), Zambian-born Irish wildlife conservationist and anti-poaching strategist
- Rosa Young (1890–1971), American educator
- Ross Young (disambiguation), several people
- Roynell Young (born 1957), professional American football safety and cornerback
- Ryan Young (born 1976), American football player

== S ==
- Samuel Young (disambiguation), several people
- Scott Young (disambiguation), several people
- Sean Young (born 1959), American actress
- Sean Young (soccer) (born 2001), Canadian soccer player
- Selvin Young (born 1983), American football running back
- Sheila Young (born 1950), speed skater and track cyclist from the United States
- Shelby Young (born 1992), American film, television and voice actress
- Simone Young (born 1961), Australian conductor
- Slater Young (born 1987), Filipino-Chinese actor and television personality
- Sophia Young (born 1983), Vincentian professional women's basketball player
- Stella Young (1982–2014), Australian comedian, journalist and disability rights activist
- Stephanie Young, American voice actress who works for anime series of FUNimation Entertainment
- Stephen Young (disambiguation), several people
- Steve Young (disambiguation), several people, includes Steven Young
- Stuart Young (accountant) (1934–1986), chairman of the BBC from 1983 until 1986
- Sydney Young (chemist) (1857–1937), British chemistry professor
- Sylvia Young (1939–2025), British theatre teacher

== T ==
- Tamera Young (born 1986), American basketball player
- Terri Young (born 1959), American pediatric ophthalmologist
- Thaddeus Young (born 1988), American basketball player
- Thomas Young (disambiguation), several people
- Tim Young (disambiguation), several people
- Tiffany Young (born Stephanie Young Hwang, 1989), American singer, member of the South Korean girl group Girls' Generation
- Toby Young (born 1963), British journalist and the author
- Todd Young (born 1972), U.S. Senator from Indiana
- Tommy Young (born 1947), American professional wrestling referee and retired professional wrestler
- Tom Young (disambiguation), several people
- Tony Young (actor) (1937–2002), American actor
- Trae Young (born 1998), American basketball player
- Trevon Young (born 1995), American football player
- Trummy Young (1912–1984), American trombonist in the swing era
- Tyrel Young, Bahamian politician

== V ==
- Val Young (born 1958), American Urban/Dance-pop artist
- Van Eps Young (1822–1895), Union Army colonel and Wisconsin politician
- Vicki Young, British journalist
- Victor Young (1899–1956), American composer
- Vince Young (born 1983), American football player
- Virginia S. Young (1917–1994), American politician

== W ==
- W. J. Young (1827–1896), Irish businessman
- Wallace Young, politician in Newfoundland and Labrador, Canada
- Walter X. Young (1918–1942), United States Marine Corps officer and Navy Cross recipient
- Wanda Young (1943–2021), American singer of The Marvelettes
- Wendell Young (born 1963), Canadian former professional ice hockey goaltender and manager
- Whitney Young (1921–1971), American civil rights leader
- Wilfred Ernest Young (1891–?), English World War I flying ace
- Willard N. Young (died 2022), American politician
- William G. Young (born 1940), judge of the Massachusetts Superior Court
- William J. Young (coach), American college basketball and football coach
- Will Young (born 1979), British singer
- William Henry Young (1863–1942), English mathematician
- William Weston Young (1776–1847), British Quaker entrepreneur, artist, botanist and inventor of the firebrick
- Winty Young, Canadian football player

== Y ==
- Yolanda Young (journalist) (born 1968), American journalist
- Yolanda Young (politician), American politician
- Yolanda Young (disambiguation), several people
- Young baronets, baronets of the UK in the surname of Young
- Yvette Young, American guitarist and front-woman of math rock band Covet

== Z ==
- Zion Young (born 2004), American football player

== See also ==
- Justice Young (disambiguation)
- Mayor Young (disambiguation)
- Younge, another surname
- Yung (surname)
- Yong (disambiguation)
