= Charles Young =

Charles Young may refer to:

== Arts and entertainment ==
- Charles Young (musician) (1686–1758), English organist and composer
- Charles Lawrence Young (1839–1887), English playwright, barrister, and baronet
- Charles Mayne Young (1777–1856), English actor
- Charles Morris Young (1869–1964), American painter
- Charles Frederick Young (1819–1874), Australian actor, comedian and theatrical manager
- Charles Rochester Young (born 1965), American composer, music educator, conductor and saxophonist

== Government ==
- Charles Young (Australian politician) (1825–1908), Victorian MLA
- Charles Young (Conservative politician) (1850–1928), English educationalist and Conservative politician
- Charles Young (administrator) (1812–?), colonial administrator for Prince Edward Island
- Charles Young (officer of arms) (1795–1869), English heraldic officer
- Charles Young (United States Army officer) (1864–1922), African American general
- Charles Alexander Young (1856–1928), merchant and politician in Manitoba, Canada
- Charles L. Young Sr. (1931–2009), American businessman and politician from Mississippi
- Charles Young Jr. (1962–2024), member of the Mississippi House of Representatives
- Charles Burney Young (1824–1904), landholder, winemaker and politician in South Australia
- Charles Carleton Vieder Young (1850–1941), chief magistrate of the Pitcairn Islands
- Bill Young (Florida politician) (Charles William Young, 1930–2013), American politician in Florida

== Sports ==
- Charles Young (American football) (c. 1867–1908), American college football coach at the University of Missouri
- Charles Young (Australian footballer) (1905–1980), Australian footballer
- Charles Young (cricketer) (1852–1913), English cricketer
- Charley Young (Charles Lee Young, born 1952), American football player
- Charles Young (sprinter) (born 1957), American sprinter, winner of the 1982 4 × 100 meter relay at the NCAA Division I Outdoor Track and Field Championships

== Others ==
- Charles Augustus Young (1834–1908), American astronomer
- Charles E. Young (1931–2023), American professor and university administrator
- Charles Young, 7th Baronet (1839–1887), English barrister
- Charles Herbert Young (c. 1853–1938), Anglican priest in Tasmania and South Australia

== See also ==
- Charles de Young (1845–1880), co-founded the newspaper that would become the San Francisco Chronicle
- Charlie Young (disambiguation)
- Charle Young (1951–2026), American football tight end
