= Brad H. Young =

Biblical scholar

Professor Bradford Humes Young
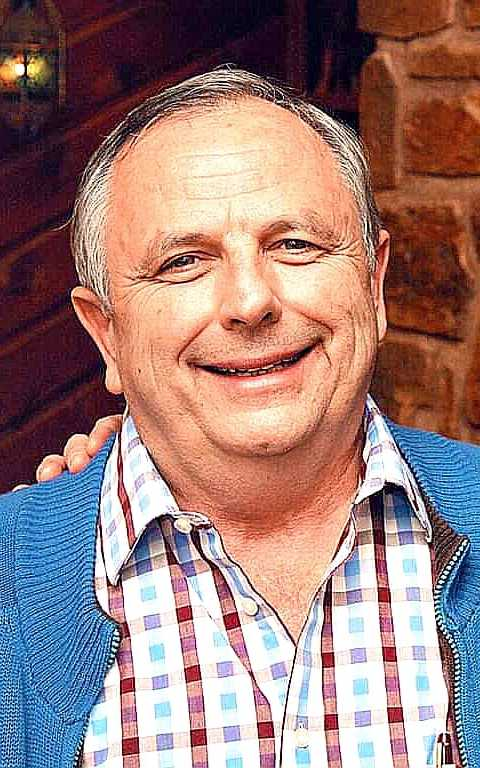
- Professor Brad Young, February 2019
- Born: 1955 (age 70–71); Oklahoma
- Occupation: Academic
- Website: bradyoung.org

Bradford Humes Young, also known as Brad Young, is a professor of Biblical Literature in Judeo Christian Studies at the Graduate Department of Oral Roberts University (ORU). He is also founder and president of the Gospel Research Foundation, Inc.

After receiving his B.A. from ORU, Young departed Tulsa for Israel. At the Hebrew University of Jerusalem, he pursued graduate studies in early Christianity and ancient Judaism. During that time he lectured at the American Institute of Holy Land Studies, served as research assistant to Prof. David Flusser, and earned two degrees, an M.A. and Ph.D. from the Hebrew University. He is one of the founding scholars of the Jerusalem School of Synoptic Studies, working closely on Gospel research with Flusser and Dr. Robert L. Lindsey. He has contributed to scholarly journals and has spoken at many academic, church, interfaith, and civic gatherings.

== Thought and writings ==
Young's writings seek to illuminate the New Testament with the help of rabbinic sources. His contribution is clear in the aspect of clarifying the enigmas found in the parables of Jesus, by drawing parallels to similar traditions in the literature of nascent Judaism, especially rabbinic literature.

It is also evident from his works that he at least considers a Hebrew, rather than Aramaic, source underlying certain sections of the (Greek) synoptic gospels. Another notable theory in his writings is that of Lukan priority in the context of the synoptic problem.

Furthermore, Young is an active contributor to the interfaith dialogue by means of a collaborative Jewish-Christian inquiry in both groups' shared heritage. This is evident from Young's publications, Jewish and Christian endorsements of his publications, and his role as editor on the board of the Compendia Rerum Iudaicarum ad Novum Testamentum.

== See also ==
- Jerusalem school hypothesis

== Bibliography ==
The following list of books and articles is not exhaustive.

=== Books ===
- The Newer Testament Selected Readings from the Hebrew Heritage Bible: Hear What They Heard, Hebrew Heritage Bible Society, 2019 ISBN 978-1-7362270-0-8 ISBN 9780578588339
- The Gospel of John from the Mouth of Yochanan : A First Century Message for the Twenty-First Century, Tulsa, OK: Hebrew Heritage Bible translation, 2009, ISBN 978-0-692-00246-9
- Spirit-Filled Life New Testament Commentary: Matthew & Mark (Spirit-Filled New Testament Commentary), Dallas: Thomas Nelson, 2006, ISBN 978-1-4185-0569-1
- Meet the Rabbis: Rabbinic Thought and the Teachings of Jesus, Peabody, Ma : Hendrickson, 2007, ISBN 978-1-56563-405-3
- Jesus and His Jewish Parables, Tulsa, OK: Gospel Research Foundation, 1999
- The Jewish Background to the Lord's Prayer, Tulsa, OK: Gospel Research Foundation, 1999, ISBN 978-0-918873-02-6
- The parables : Jewish tradition and Christian interpretation, Peabody, Ma : Hendrickson, 1998, ISBN 978-1-59856-303-0
- Paul, the Jewish theologian : a Pharisee among Christians, Jews, and Gentiles, Peabody, Mass. : Hendrickson, 1997, ISBN 978-1-56563-248-6
- Jesus the Jewish theologian, Peabody, Mass. : Hendrickson Publishers, 1995, ISBN 978-1-56563-060-4
- Jesus and His Jewish Parables: Rediscovering the Roots of Jesus’ Teaching, New York: Paulist, 1989
- The parable as a literary genre in rabbinic literature and in the Gospels, Jerusalem : Hebrew University of Jerusalem, 1986
- The Jewish Background to the Lord's Prayer Dayton, OH: Center for Judaic-Christian Studies, 1984

=== Articles ===
- "The Seven Types of Pharisees and the Fear of God in the Synoptic Gospels" in Jerusalem Perspective, 2024.
- "A fresh examination of the cross, Jesus and the Jewish people." In Jesus' last week, 191–209. Leiden: Brill, 2006
- "'Save the adulteress'! Ancient Jewish 'responsa' in the gospels?" in New Testament Studies, 41,1, 1995, 59–70
- "The cross, Jesus and the Jewish people" in Immanuel, 24–25, 1990, 23–34
- "The Cross, Jesus and the Jewish People." In The New Testament and Christian-Jewish Dialogue : Studies in Honor of David Flusser, ed. David and Lowe Flusser, Malcolm F. Jerusalem, Israel: Ecumenical Theological Research Fraternity in Israel, 1990.
- “Understanding Parables,” Jerusalem Perspective 21 (1989): 9–10.
- Brad Young and David Flusser "Messianic Blessings in Jewish and Christian Texts." In Judaism and the Origins of Christianity Jerusalem: Magnes Press, 1988, 280–300
- "The ascension motif of 2 Corinthians 12 in Jewish, Christian and Gnostic texts." Grace Theological Journal 9 (Spr 1988): 73–103
- "[On] Elmar Camillo Dos Santos (comp.), Robert Lisle Lindsey (ed.), 'A Comparative Greek Concordance of the Synoptic Gospels' (1985)" in Immanuel, 20, 1986, 38–44
- "Jewish Scholarship and Jesus." Immanuel, no. 19 (1985): 102–106.
- "[On] Donald A. Hagner, The Jewish Reclamation of Jesus, Grand Rapids, Mich: Zondervan, 1984, 341pp." in Immanuel, 19, (1984–5), 102-106
