= Thomas Young =

Thomas Young may refer to:

== Military ==
- Thomas Young (American revolutionary) (1731–1777), member of the Sons of Liberty
- Thomas James Young (1827–1869), recipient of the Victoria Cross during the Indian mutiny
- Thomas Young (VC) (1895–1966), recipient of the Victoria Cross during World War I
- Tomas Young (1979–2014), Iraq War veteran, subject of the documentary Body of War

== Politics ==
- Thomas Young (MP for Shropshire), MP for Shropshire four times between 1380 and 1399
- Thomas Young (MP for Winchelsea), 1413–1425, MP for Winchelsea
- Thomas Young (died 1427), MP for Bristol 1414
- Thomas Yonge or Young, MP for Bristol (1435–1453, 1455) and Gloucestershire, justice of the Common Pleas and the King's Bench
- Thomas Ainslie Young (1797–1860), official and political figure in Lower Canada
- Thomas Young (Australian politician) (1813–1904), South Australian MHA
- Thomas L. Young (1832–1888), governor of Ohio
- Thomas Ganley Young (born 1947), mayor of Syracuse, New York, 1986–1993

== Religion ==
- Thomas Young (bishop) (1507–1568), Archbishop of York
- Thomas Young (Scottish theologian) (1587–1655), Scottish Presbyterian and author
- Thomas Young (writer and theologian) (1772–1835), English writer, theologian, educator, and clergyman
- Thomas Cullen Young (1880–1955), Scottish Presbyterian anthropologist and missionary

== Sports ==
- Thomas Jefferson Young (1902–1964), Negro leagues baseball player
- Thomas Young (rugby union) (born 1992), Welsh rugby union player
- Thomas Young (swimmer) (born 1991), British Paralympic swimmer
- Thomas Young (footballer), Scottish footballer
- Tommy Young (born 1947), wrestler
- Tommy Young (footballer) (born 1947), Scottish footballer
- Thomas Young (sprinter) (born 2000), British Paralympic sprinter

== Other ==
- Thomas Young (architect) (1805–1860), English-Canadian architect, surveyor, artist
- Thomas Young (developer) (c. 1650–?), English woodcarver and property developer
- Thomas Young (scientist) (1773–1829), British polymath, scientist and Egyptologist
- Thomas Crane Young (1858–1934), American architect
- Thomas Young (entrepreneur) (1895–1971), founder of YESCO, a Las Vegas corporation, in 1920
- Thomas Daniel Young (1919–1997), American professor of Southern literature
- Tommie Young (born 1949), U.S. singer
- Thomas Young (mass murderer) (1931–1959), Canadian mass murderer
- Thomas Young (tenor), American operatic tenor
- Thomas Young (obstetrician) (1725–1783), Edinburgh surgeon and obstetrician

== See also ==
- Thomas Youngs (disambiguation)
- Thomas Young Duncan (1836–1914), New Zealand politician
- Tom Young (disambiguation)
