= Henry Young (disambiguation) =

Henry Young (1803–1870) was a Governor of South Australia and of Tasmania.

Henry Young may also refer to:

- Henry Melvin Young (1915–1943), British World War II squadron leader
- Henry Esson Young (1862–1939), physician and politician in British Columbia, Canada
- Henry G. Young (1891–1956), American lawyer and politician
- Henry Young (footballer) (1873–1923), Australian rules footballer for Geelong
- Henry Young (major) (1841–1866), Union spy commander during the American Civil War
- Henry Young (deputy governor), deputy governor of Bombay, 1668–1669
- Henry Young (tennis) (born 1923), Australian centenarian World War II veteran and tennis player
- Henry Young (founder) (1842–1929), British bronze founder and foundry owner

== See also ==
- Harry Young (disambiguation)
- Henri Young (1911–1972), Alcatraz prisoner
- Henri Young, American child actor from the film Aliens in the Attic
