= Andrew Young (disambiguation) =

Andrew Young (born 1932) is an American civil rights activist, former congressman, and former U.S. ambassador to the United Nations.

Andrew or Andy Young may also refer to:

== Politics and law ==
- Andrew Young (British politician) (1858–1943), British MP
- Andrew Robert Young (born 1961), American diplomat, U.S. Ambassador to Burkina Faso
- Andrew Clarence David Young (1899–1988), chief magistrate of the Pitcairn Islands

== Sports ==
- A. S. "Doc" Young (Andrew Spurgeon Young) (1919–1996), African American sports journalist
- Andy Young (footballer) (1925–2008), Scottish footballer
- Andrew Young (skier) (born 1992), Scottish Olympic cross-country skier
- Andrew Young (boxer) (born 1980), Scottish boxer
- Andrew Young (baseball) (born 1994), American baseball player
- Andy Young (sprinter) (born 1950), American sprinter, winner of the 1969 4 × 400 meter relay at the NCAA Division I Outdoor Track and Field Championships

== Others ==
- Andrew Young (poet, born 1807) (1807–1889), Scottish poet and hymnwriter
- Andrew J. Young (Medal of Honor) (1837–1910), American soldier in the American Civil War
- Andrew Douglas Young (1881–1950), Australian stockbroker
- Andrew Young (poet, born 1885) (1885–1971), Scottish clergyman and poet
- Andrew Young (mathematician) (1891–1968), Scottish mathematician and natural scientist
- Andy Young (psychologist) (fl. 1970s–present), British neuropsychologist
- Andi Young, Asian-American singer and songwriter

== See also ==
- Yang (surname)
- Yang (Korean surname)
