= Young Hotel =

Young Hotel may refer to:

- Alexander Young Building, Honolulu, Hawaii, United States, which operated as a hotel in the early 20th century
- Fort Young Hotel, Roseau, Dominica
- Young's Hotel (Boston), Massachusetts, United States, which operated from 1860 to 1927
- Mississippi hotel operated by E. F. Young, Jr. (1898–1950)
