= Jake Young =

Jake Young may refer to:

- Jake Young (American football)
- Jake Young (footballer)

== See also ==
- Jacob Young (disambiguation)
