= Joseph Yang =

Joseph Yang may refer to:

- Joseph Steven Yang (born 1968), South Korean-born American actor
- Joseph Yang Yongqiang (born 1970), Chinese Roman Catholic priest

== See also ==
- Joseph Young (disambiguation)
