= Tom Young =

Tom Young may refer to:

- Tom Young (basketball) (1932–2022), American college basketball coach
- Tom Young (cricketer) (1890–1936), English cricketer
- Tom Young (American football) (1907–1973), American college football coach in the 1940s and 1950s
- Tom Young (Australian footballer) (born 1992), Australian rules footballer
- Tom Young (novelist) (born 1962), American novelist
- Tom Young (trade unionist) (1870–1953), New Zealand seaman and trade unionist
- Tom Young (baseball) (1902–?), Negro leagues utility player
- Tom Young Jr. (born 1971), member of the South Carolina Senate
- Tom Young (Ohio politician), member of the Ohio House of Representatives

== See also ==
- Thomas Young (disambiguation)
- A. Thomas Young (born 1938), American aerospace executive and NASA director
- Tommy Young (born 1947), professional wrestling referee and retired professional wrestler
- Tommy Young (footballer) (born 1947), Scottish footballer
- Tom Youngs (disambiguation)
