= Chris Young =

Chris or Christopher Young may refer to:

== Arts and entertainment ==
- Christopher Young (born 1958), American music composer
- Christopher Young (producer) (born 1959), Scottish television and film producer
- Chris Young (actor) (born 1971), American film and television actor
- Chris Young (singer) (born 1985), American country music singer
  - Chris Young (album), his self-titled debut album

== Sports ==
=== Baseball ===
- Chris Young (pitcher) (born 1979), American baseball pitcher
- Chris Young (baseball coach) (born 1981), American baseball coach
- Chris Young (outfielder) (born 1983), American baseball outfielder

=== Other sports ===
- Chris Young (footballer, born 1886) (1886–1956), English footballer
- Chris Young (rugby league) (1945–2016), British rugby league footballer
- Chris Devlin-Young (born 1962), American alpine skier
- Chris Young (American football) (born 1980), American NFL football player
- Chris Young (gymnast) (born 1973), American artistic gymnast

== Others ==
- Chris Taliutafa Young (1892–1967), Samoan chief and claimant to the title Tui Manu'a

== See also ==
- Young (surname)
- Chris Yonge (born 1991), a Canadian rapper and sound producer
