= Alex Young =

Alex Young may refer to:

- Alex Young (athlete) (born 1994), American Olympic hammer thrower
- Alex Young (Australian footballer) (1879–1963), Australian rules footballer
- Alex Young (baseball) (born 1993), American baseball player
- Alex Young (basketball) (born 1989), basketball player
- Alex Young (curler), Scottish curler
- Alex Young (footballer, born 1880) (1880–1959), known as Sandy, Scottish international footballer who played for Everton
- Alex Young (footballer, born 1937) (1937–2017), known as "The Golden Vision", Scottish international footballer who played for Hearts and Everton
- Alex Young (studio executive) (born 1971), ex-husband of Kate Walsh, and co-president of production at 20th Century Fox
- Alex Young, member of the rock band This World Fair
- Alex Young (rugby league) (born 1999), Jamaica international rugby league footballer
- Alex Young (actor), West End stage actress

== See also ==
- Alex Yoong (born 1976), Malaysian Chinese racing driver
- Alec Young (1925–2010), Scottish footballer
- Alexander Young (disambiguation)
