= Ernest Young =

Ernest or Ernie Young may refer to:

- Ernest Young (politician) (1880–1953), British member of parliament with the Liberal Party
- Ernest Young (priest), archdeacon of Calcutta in the mid-20th century
- Ernest A. Young, law professor and author
- Ernest P. Young (born c. 1940), American historian at the University of Michigan
- Ernie Young (born 1969), American baseball outfielder and coach
- Ernie Young (footballer, born 1892) (1892–1962), English football forward for South Shields and Durham City
- Ernie Young (footballer, born 1893) (1893–1950), English football forward for Middlesbrough and Darlington

== See also ==
- Ernst & Young, a multi-national professional services company based in London
- Wilfred Ernest Young (1891 – after 1920), English World War I flying ace
