= Charles Young Jr. =

American politician (1962–2024)

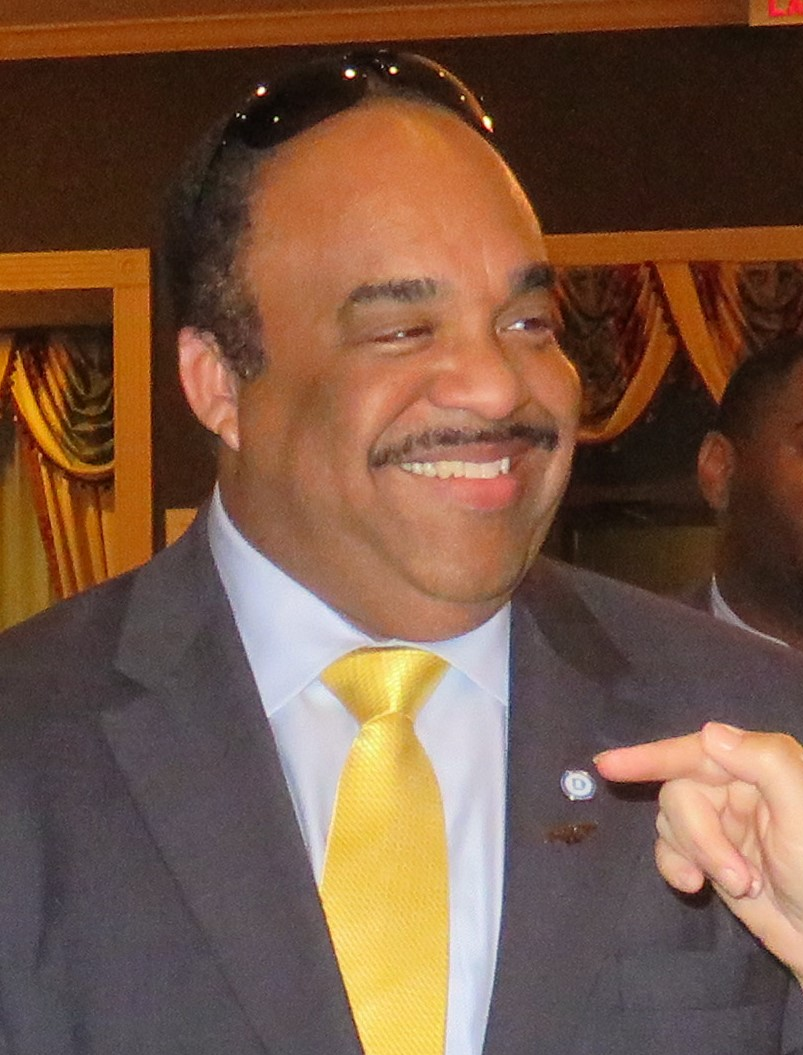
- Young in 2016

Member of the Mississippi House of Representatives from the 82nd district
- In office 2012 – December 19, 2024
- Preceded by: Wilbert L. Jones
- Succeeded by: Gregory Elliott

Personal details
- Born: July 9, 1962 Meridian, Mississippi, U.S.
- Died: December 19, 2024 (aged 62) Jackson, Mississippi, U.S.
- Party: Democratic
- Relations: E. F. Young Jr. (grandfather); Charles L. Young Sr. (father)
- Profession: President, E.F. Young Jr. Manufacturing Company

Charles Lemuel Young Jr. (July 9, 1962 – December 19, 2024) was an American politician. He was a member of the Mississippi House of Representatives from the 82nd District, being first elected in 2011. His district represents Lauderdale County including the city of Meridian. He was a member of the Democratic party.

== Background ==
He was the son of Doretha (née Connor) Young and Charles L. Young Sr., who served in the Mississippi House of Representatives from 1980 until his death in 2009. His paternal grandfather is E. F. Young Jr. who founded a cosmetics firm and hotel in Meridian, Mississippi with the help of his wife Velma Ernestine Beal-Young. He attended Tougaloo College and Mississippi State University, Meridian.

He had three siblings, Deidre Young, Arthur Young and Veldore Young. His youngest sister, Veldore Young-Graham, currently serves as the County Court Judge for Lauderdale County, Mississippi.

Young died at a hospital in Jackson, Mississippi, on December 19, 2024, at the age of 62.

== Electoral history ==
=== 2011 ===
Mississippi House of Representatives Democratic primary (82nd district)
Party	Candidate	Votes	%
Democratic	Wilbert Jones (inc.)	888	46.52
Democratic	Charles Young, Jr.	1,021	53.48

Mississippi House of Representatives general election (82nd district)
Party	Candidate	Votes	%
Democratic	Charles Young, Jr.	3,818	100.00

=== 2015 ===
Mississippi House of Representatives Democratic primary (82nd district)
Party	Candidate	Votes	%
Democratic	Charles L. Young, Jr. (inc.)	1,521	100.00

Mississippi House of Representatives general election (82nd district)
Party	Candidate	Votes	%
Democratic	Charles L. Young, Jr. (inc.)	3,203	100.00

=== 2019 ===
Mississippi House of Representatives Democratic primary (82nd district)
Party	Candidate	Votes	%
Democratic	Charles L. Young, Jr. (inc.)	1,994	100.00

Mississippi House of Representatives general election (82nd district)
Party	Candidate	Votes	%
Democratic	Charles L. Young, Jr. (inc.)	3,649	100.00

== Political positions ==
=== Religious Liberty Accommodations Act ===
Young was a vocal critic of Mississippi House Bill 1523 (H.B. 1523) which was passed by the legislature 69-44 in 2016. The bill allows individuals to discriminate against same-sex couples who have "deeply held religious beliefs or moral convictions" against such unions. Speaking to the Meridian Star after the passage of the bill, Young said:

I, as an individual, might disagree from a personal standpoint with certain protections of human rights. I personally might not like gay rights, I personally might not like women's rights. But as a duly elected official, I have a sworn obligation to protect and to uphold every persons' rights. And as a publicly-elected official, I have to be able to separate my personal from my elected responsibilities in my capacity.

=== Mississippi state flag controversy ===
In 2020, Mississippi was the only state in the United States that incorporates the Confederate battle flag. Contrary to many of his colleagues in the Legislature, Young believed that the fate of the flag should be decided by them, and not be left for the voters to decide:

My preference would be that the Legislature not pass the buck and that the Legislature conduct the vote to determine the future of the current flag … We’re the only state in the nation that continues to bear the stars and bars and I think we need to change. My reason for that is financial. The state of Mississippi loses a ton of money each year.
