= Bob Mitcheson =

English footballer

Personal information
- Date of birth: 1901
- Place of birth: Blackhill, Consett, England
- Date of death: 1938 (aged 37)
- Place of death: Lanchester, County Durham, England
- Position: Outside forward

Senior career*
Years	Team	Apps	(Gls)
19??–1922	Leadgate Park		
1922–1923	Darlington	6	(0)
1923–19??	Leadgate Park		
- * Club domestic league appearances and goals

Robert Mitcheson (1901–1938) was an English footballer who played as an outside forward in the Football League for Darlington and in non-league football for Leadgate Park.

== Life and career ==
Mitcheson was born and raised in Blackhill, County Durham, and was three months old at the time of the 1901 Census. He was the son of Robert B. Mitcheson, who worked as a labourer at a steelworks gas producer, and his wife Mary Jane.

Mitcheson was a member of the Leadgate Park team that beat Hartlepools United 2–1 after extra time to win the 1921 Durham Senior Cup. Described as "a much sought outside right", he joined Third Division North runners-up Darlington ahead of the 1922–23 Football League season, but played infrequently for the first team, and sometimes at outside left. At the end of the season, during which he made only six league appearances, he and teammate Ernie Young moved to Leadgate Park of the North-Eastern League.

He died in 1938 at the age of 37, (Note: Mitcheson's death was registered in the second quarter of 1938 in the Lanchester, County Durham, registration district. His full name is variously recorded as Robert Erthington Mitcheson on his birth certificate, and as Robert Hetherington Mitcheson on the burial index. His death certificate and 1901 Census entry list a middle initial of H, while his 1911 Census entry has the middle initial E.) and was buried at Blackhill Cemetery, Consett, on 4 April 1938.
