= Samuel Young =

Samuel or Sam Young may refer to:

- Samuel Baldwin Marks Young (1840–1924), United States Army general
- Samuel H. Young (1922–2017), United States Representative from Illinois
- Samuel Young (general superintendent) (1901–1990), from the Church of the Nazarene and Eastern Nazarene College
- Sam Young (English cricketer) (born 2000), English cricketer
- Samuel Young (Jamaican cricketer) (born 1902, date of death unknown), Jamaican cricketer
- Samuel Young (Irish politician) (1822–1918), oldest-ever member of the UK House of Commons
- Samuel Young (New York politician) (1779–1850), New York state politician
- Samuel Young (Vermont politician), Vermont state politician
- Samuel Young (footballer) (1883–1954), Irish footballer
- Sir Samuel Young, 1st Baronet, British colonial administrator
- Sam Young (American football) (born 1987), American football offensive tackle
- Sam Young (basketball) (born 1985), American basketball player
- Sam Young (Neighbours), a fictional character from the Australian soap opera Neighbours

== See also ==
- Sammy Younge Jr. (1944-1966), murdered civil rights and voting rights activist
- Samuel Youngs (1760–1839), New York assemblyman from Westchester County, inspiration for The Legend of Sleepy Hollow
- Samuel Youngs (1753–1797), New York assemblyman from Queens County 1794
