= Billy Kemp =

American adult film actor and television executive (born 1977)

- Born: William Kemp; May 25, 1977 (age 49); Montana, U.S.
- Other name: Jordan Young
- Occupations: Actor; Model; Dancer; Television executive; Producer; Casting director
- Years active: 1991–present
- Agent: Persons of Interest Productions

William Kemp (born May 25, 1977), also known by the stage name Jordan Young, is an American television executive, producer, and casting director. He began his entertainment career as a performer and screenwriter in adult films during the 1990s before shifting into mainstream network television production. He has served as a senior talent executive for global production banners including FremantleMedia and Banijay Studios, and is a co-founder of the talent relations and casting firm Persons of Interest Productions.

== Early life and education ==
Kemp was born in Montana to a multiracial family of Korean and Greek descent. During his fourth-grade school year, his family relocated to Wyoming so his father could work near his twin brother. In high school, Kemp competed in gymnastics and played as a football tailback. Following graduation, he moved to Denver, Colorado, to live with his brother and attend college, financing his studies by working as an exotic dancer.

== Career ==
=== Discovery and modeling ===
Kemp's look led to youth commercial modeling roles for brands including Calvin Klein and Banana Republic beginning at age 14. While based in Denver, he sent a physical modeling portfolio to Falcon Studios director John Rutherford, who referred him to a local adult industry scout. This contact led to an introduction to director Chi Chi LaRue, who noted a historical lack of representation for multiracial talent in gay erotica and arranged for Kemp to relocate to Los Angeles.

Adopting the pseudonym Jordan Young, Kemp made his on-screen debut at age 18 in the 1994 film Strung Up, followed by a lead role in Mustang's Nightwatch II. Beyond modeling for erotica publications, he penned a regular commentary column called "New Kid on the Cock" for Skin Flicks magazine and appeared in Ronnie Larsen's 1997 industry documentary Shooting Porn, which screened at the Berlin International Film Festival.

Transitioning behind the camera, Kemp wrote feature scripts for Falcon and All Worlds Video, including The Taking of Jake (1997), Like Father, Like Son, and Hardcore (1997). He earned his first production credit on the feature Lost in Vegas, for which he also wrote the script. His adult media work received one Grabby Award, a Men in Video Award, and two nominations at the GayVN Awards.

=== Mainstream and Early Unscripted Television work ===
Kemp left adult cinema in the early 2000s, reverted to his legal name Billy Kemp, and entered mainstream television as a low-level story researcher for daytime talk programs. He advanced into leadership roles within the reality, lifestyle, and dating sub-genres, managing casting blocks for network series including ElimiDate (Syndication), Wife Swap (ABC), Temptation Island (FOX), and Nanny 911.

=== FremantleMedia and Banijay Studios ===
Kemp spent a decade working as Vice President of Talent and Casting at FremantleMedia North America. He directed overall talent acquisition architectures, open calls, and celebrity bookings for major broadcast series including American Idol, America's Got Talent, The X Factor, The Price Is Right, Let's Make a Deal, and The Great Christmas Light Fight. He also created an internal tracking database to scout and develop incoming on-air personalities for the studio.

He later joined Banijay Studios North America as Vice President of Talent Development, steering casting strategy across the production house's slate while formatting new concepts. He pitched and sold the docu-soap What Happens at The Abbey to E! and scouted public figures Teyana Taylor and Iman Shumpert, serving as an Executive Producer on their resulting VH1 reality series Teyana & Iman. His development slate at Banijay also encompassed ABC's Child Support, USA's The Secret Life of Kids, and ABC's Big Fan.

=== Persons of Interest Productions ===
Kemp partnered with talent executive Katie Krim to launch Persons of Interest Productions, a full-service Hollywood packaging, casting, and celebrity booking firm. Operating independently, the company creates unscripted program designs and manages multi-market casting calls for various network programs, including ongoing cycles for ABC's The Bachelor and The Bachelorette television franchises.

== Personal life ==
Kemp lives in Los Angeles metropolitan area, where his personal activities focus on outdoor fitness and hiking. During his tenure in the adult industry, his personal relationships included partnerships with fellow performers Tom Katt and Logan Reed, as well as a relationship with Sam Dixon, a former police officer who later performed in adult media.

== Filmography ==
=== Film ===
Year	Title	Role	Notes
1994	Strung Up	Jordan Young	
1995	Night Watch 2	Jordan Young	Debut
1995	Butt Buddy Bonanaza	Jordan Young	
1995	Jim Steel's Pickup	Jordan Young	
1995	The Best of Eduardo	Jordan Young	
1995	Naked Truth	Jordan Young	
1995	Pick Up	Job Applicant	
1995	Love Money	Jordan Young	
1995	Point of View	Jordan Young	
1995	Inches Away	Jordan Young	
1995	Total Corruption 2: One Night In Jail	Jordan Young	
1995	The Ryker Files	Jordan	
1995	Touched By an Anal	Jordan Young	
1995	Fresh Buns 9	Jordan Young	
1996	Idol in the Sky	Cowboy	
1996	Rescue 69-11	Jordan Young	
1996	Dino Dreams On	Jordan Young	
1996	Dax	Jordan Young	
1996	Men Only	Jordan Young	
1996	Hung Riders 2: The Heat is On	Hop Sing	
1996	The Company We Keep	Jordan Young	
1996	Driven: No Turning Back	Jordan Young	
1996	White Hot	Blonde in Corvette	
1996	Ambush	Jordan Young	
1996	My Sister's Husband	Bar Patron	
1996	Chained Desires	Jordan Young	
1996	Lost in Vegas	Jordan Young	
1996	Lip Lock	Jordan Young	
1997	Our Trespasses	Seminarian	
1997	Big As This Box 5	Jordan Young	
1997	Needy & Meaty 2	Jordan Young	
1997	Positions of Mine 69	Jordan Young	
1997	Beefeaters 2	Jordan Young	
1997	Hawaiian Lei	Jordan Young	
1997	Hawaiian Illustrated	Jordan Young	
1997	Hard Core	Jake's boyfriend	
1997	Initiation 2: Hell Week	Jordan Young	
1997	The Freshmen	Late Jock	
1997	Tales from the Backlot 2	Jordan Young	
1997	Summer Reunion	Jordan Young	
1998	Sticky Buns	Jordan Young	
1999	Cockstar 3	Jordan Young	
1999	Ball Gravy	Jordan Young	
1999	Anal Nitrate	Jordan Young	
2002	The Backseat Boys	Jordan Young	
2004	Bottom Boy Bonanza 2	Jordan Young	
2004	Widespread	Jordan Young	
2005	Laymen	Jordan Young	
2005	Man Talk	Jordan Young	
2006	The Best of Tom Chase 1	Jordan Young	
2011	Self-Sucking Studs	Jordan Young	
2012	My Big Fucking Dick 12: Mike Branson	Jordan Young	

=== Director ===
Year	Title	Role	Notes
2002	Earth Guys Are Easy	Director	as Jordan Young

=== Producer ===
Year	Title	Role	Notes
1995	Lost in Vegas	Co-producer (as Jordan Young)	
1998–2008	Headliners & Legends with Matt Lauer	Producer	
1999	DreamMaker	Associate Producer	
2000	Lover or Loser	Associate Producer	
2001	Who Knows the Band?	Producer	
2002	Temptation Island	Casting Producer	
2003	The Wade Robson Project	Producer (pilot episode)	
2003	Anything for Love	Segment Producer	
2003	Girl Makes Band	Talent Producer	
2006	America's Got Talent	Talent Producer	
2017	What Happens at The Abbey	Executive Producer	
2018	Teyana & Iman	Executive Producer	

=== Writer ===
Year	Title	Role	Notes
1995	Fly Bi Night	Jordan Young	
1995	Lost in Vegas	Jordan Young	
1996	Brother to Brother	Jordan Young	
1996	Street Boyz	Jordan Young	
1996	Log Jammer	Jordan Young	
1997	Hardcore	Jordan Young	
1997	Strip Tease	Jordan Young	
2000	Echoes	Jordan Young	
2001	The Missing Link	Jordan Young	
2002	Deep South: The Big and the Easy, Part 1	Jordan Young	
2002	Deep South: The Big and the Easy, Part 2	Jordan Young	
2017	What Happens at The Abbey	Creator / Writer	
2018	Teyana & Iman	Story Developer / Writer	

=== Casting director ===
Year	Title	Role	Notes
2001	elimiDATE	Casting Director	
2004	Next Action Star	Casting Director	
2004	How Clean Is Your House?	Casting Director	
2004	The Next Great Champ	Casting Director	
2004	Distraction	Casting Director	
2004	Wife Swap	Casting Director	
2004	Temptation Island	Casting Director	
2004	Nanny 911	Casting Director	
2005	Property Ladder	Casting Director	
2006	Love on the Rocks	Casting Director	
2007	American Inventor	Casting Director	
2007	Thank God You're Here	Casting Director	
2007–2008	Temptation	Casting Director	
2007–2008	America's Got Talent	Casting Director / VP of Talent	
2008	Farmer Wants a Wife	Casting Director	
2008	Can You Duet?	Casting Director	
2008	Celebrity Family Feud	Casting Director	
2008	Million Dollar Password	Casting Director	
2002–2016	American Idol	VP of Talent and Casting	
2011–2013	The X Factor	VP of Talent and Casting	
—	The Price Is Right	VP of Talent and Casting	
—	Let's Make a Deal	VP of Talent and Casting	
2013–2015	The Great Christmas Light Fight	VP of Talent and Casting	
2017	What Happens at The Abbey	Creator / VP of Talent Development	
2017	Big Fan	VP of Talent Development	
2018	Child Support	VP of Talent Development	
2018	The Secret Life of Kids	VP of Talent Development	
2018	Teyana & Iman	Executive Producer	
2020–present	The Bachelor	Casting Director	Through Persons of Interest Productions
2020–present	The Bachelorette	Casting Director	Through Persons of Interest Productions

== Awards and nominations ==
Year	Award	Category	Work	Result	Ref
1997	Adult Video News	Men in Video Awards Most	Cuddly Stud	Won	
2001	GayVN Awards	Best Screenplay	Echoes	Nominated	
2001	Grabby Awards	Best Screenplay	Echoes	Won	
2003	GayVN Awards	Best Screenplay	Deep South: The Big and the Easy, Part 1 & Deep South: The Big and the Easy, Part 2	Nominated	
2003	Grabby Awards	Best Screenplay	Deep South: The Big and the Easy, Part 1 & Deep South: The Big and the Easy, Part 2	Nominated	
