= Younge =

Younge is an English language surname. Notable people with this name include:

- Adrian Younge (born 1978), American composer, arranger and music producer
- Elizabeth Younge (1740–1797), English actress
- Fred Younge (1825–1870), English actor in Australia
- Gary Younge (born 1969), British journalist with The Guardian
- John Milton Younge (born 1955), US District Judge in Pennsylvania
- Sammy Younge Jr. (1944–1966), American civil rights activist, murdered
