= Brad Young =

Brad or Bradley Young may refer to:

- Brad Young (cricketer) (born 1973), Australian cricketer
- Brad H. Young (born 1955), American biblical scholar
- Brad Young (footballer, born 2002), English footballer
- Brad Young (footballer, born 2003), English footballer
- Brad Young, co-founder of music production company Underground Productions, Inc.
