= Ross Young =

Ross Young may refer to:

- Ross Young (footballer) (born 1983), Australian rules footballer
- Ross Young (politician) (1962–2021), member of the Legislative Assembly of Prince Edward Island
- Ross Young (rugby union), CEO of USA Rugby
- Ross B. Young, founder of the Memphis Press (1909)

== See also ==
- Ross Young's, food company
- Ross Youngs (1897–1927), baseball player
