= Joe Young =

Joe Young may refer to:

- Joe Young (horse) (1876–1898), award-winning Standardbred harness racing trotter
- Joe Young (lyricist) (1889–1939), American lyricist
- Joe Young (defensive end) (1933–2019), American football player
- Joe Young (politician) (born c. 1947), Canadian communist politician
- Joe Young (safety) (born 1988), American football safety
- Joe Young (basketball) (born 1992), American basketball player
- Joe Young (MLB 2K), a fictional baseball player used in the MLB 2K series of video games as a replacement for Barry Bonds beginning circa 2006

== See also ==
- Joseph Young (disambiguation)
- Mighty Joe Young (disambiguation)
