= Mayor Young =

Mayor Young may refer to numerous mayors:

- Andrew Young, mayor of Atlanta, Georgia
- Bob Young (mayor), mayor of Augusta-Richmond County, Georgia
- Coleman Young, mayor of Detroit, Michigan
- Harry Young (mayor), council president of San Jose, California
- Jack Young (politician), 51st Mayor of Baltimore
- James Young (mayor), mayor of Philadelphia, Mississippi
- Leigh J. Young, mayor of Ann Arbor, Michigan
- Michael Young (mayor), mayor of Victoria, British Columbia

== See also ==
- Young (surname)
