= David Bivin =

American writer

- דוד ביווין
- Born: July 20, 1939 (age 87); Cleveland, Oklahoma
- Occupation: Scholar
- Spouse: Josa Bivin

David N. Bivin (Hebrew: דוד ביווין; born July 20, 1939, in Cleveland, Oklahoma) is an Israeli-American biblical scholar, member of the Jerusalem School of Synoptic Research. His role at the Jerusalem School involves publishing the journal Jerusalem Perspective and organizing seminars.

== Career ==
=== Jerusalem Perspective ===
Along with Jeffrey Magnuson, Bivin founded Jerusalem Perspective in 1987 as a monthly, four-page newsletter. Later it became a quarterly, forty-page, full-color magazine. From 1987 to 1999, Jerusalem Perspective published fifty-six print issues, after which it transitioned to an online-only distribution format. Bivin serves as its publisher and editor.

=== Methodology ===
Bivin's work sometimes involves taking a Greek phrase from the Bible, attempting to uncover what the underlying Hebrew idiom would have been, and then translating and interpreting the idiom, in other words relating a Greek text to its Hebrew equivalent, then translating it to English.

== Family ==
David Bivin immigrated to Israel in 1963. Bivin served as a sergeant in an Israeli army reserve infantry unit from 1974 to 1991. He and his wife resided in a suburb of Jerusalem, Israel, for many years. He passed away on July 14, 2026.

== Works ==
=== Books ===
- Bivin, David; Bivin, Josa (1972). Hebrew 40: translations, units 1-40. Mount Zion, Israel: American Institute of Holy Land Studies.
- ———; Goldfarb, Robert (1977). Fluent Biblical and Modern Hebrew. Jerusalem: The American Upland. OCLC 4677922.
- ———; Blizzard, Roy B. (1983). Understanding the Difficult Words of Jesus. Arcadia, CA: Makor Foundation. OCLC 17532669.
- ———; Tverberg, Lois; Okkema, Bruce (2005). New Light on the Difficult Words of Jesus: Insights from His Jewish Context. Holland, MI: En-Gedi Resource Center. ISBN 9780974948225. OCLC 318198425. Although similar in title to Bivin & Blizzard (1983), it is substantially different in content. Much of the book was initially published in the journal Jerusalem Perspective.

=== Chapters ===
- ——— (2006). "Evidence of an Editor's Hand in Two Instances of Mark's Account of Jesus' Last Week?"". In Notley, R. Steven; Turnage, Marc; Becker, Brian (eds.). Jesus' Last Week. Jerusalem studies in the Synoptic Gospels. Vol. 1. Leiden: Brill. ISBN 9789004147904.

=== Journals edited ===
- Jerusalem perspective Online. Jerusalem, Israel: David Bivin, 1999-now.
- Jerusalem perspective : a monthly report on research into the words of Jesus. Jerusalem, Israel: David Bivin, 1987–1999.

== See also ==
- Jerusalem school hypothesis
- Robert Lisle Lindsey
