= Fred Young =

Fred Young may refer to:

- Fred Young (director) (1900–1977), Chinese-Indonesian filmmaker
- Fred Young (Ohio politician) (1932–2006), member of the Ohio House of Representatives
- Fred Young (Ontario politician) (1907–1993), Canadian politician
- Fred A. Young (1904–1973), New York politician and judge
- Fred E. Young (1919–2005), American biblical scholar
- Fred Young, better known as Fred Begay (1932–2013), Native American nuclear physicist
- Fred Young (businessman), American businessman
- Fred Young (New Zealand politician) (1888–1962), New Zealand hotel employee and manager, trade unionist, soldier and politician
- James Fred Young, known as Fred Young, seventh president of Elon University
- Fred Young (born 1958), member of the Kentucky Headhunters

== See also ==
- John Fred Young, member of Black Stone Cherry
- Fredd Young (born 1961), American football player
- Frederick Young (disambiguation)
