= Robert Lisle Lindsey =

American-Israeli biblical scholar

Robert L. Lindsey
- Born: August 16, 1917; Norman, Oklahoma
- Died: May 31, 1995 (aged 77)
- Occupation: Academic Pastoral
- Spouse: Margaret Lutz

Robert Lisle Lindsey (1917–1995), founded together with David Flusser the Jerusalem School of Synoptic Research.

He spent most of his adult life as pastor in the Holy Land. He is especially known for pastoring the Narkis Street Baptist Church in Jerusalem. His biography was published under the name One Foot In Heaven: The Story of Bob Lindsey of Jerusalem. While rescuing an Arab orphan from the dangerous Israel-Jordan border in 1961, Lindsey was seriously injured after stepping on a land mine which resulted in the loss of his left foot.

He was a New Testament scholar. He was a contributor to the Jerusalem Perspective, an academic journal of a consortium of Israeli scholars, including Jews, Christians, and others, of Jesus Research, also known as the Quest for the Historical Jesus.

== Contributions to scholarship ==
Lindsey (B.A., University of Oklahoma, Th.M., Princeton Theological Seminary, Th.M. and Ph.D., Southern Baptist Theological Seminary) is the author of A Hebrew Translation of The Gospel of Mark. The book is notable for its solution to the Synoptic Problem. He argues the existence of a Proto-Mark gospel ("Ur Markus"), which was a highly literal translation from an originally Hebrew source into Greek, which he calls the Proto-Narrative. The text of the Gospel of Luke is the most faithful to and best preserves this Proto-Narrative. Especially in the "minor agreements" between Matthew and Luke against Mark, it is evident that Mark deviates paraphrastically from the Proto-Narrative. Mark's paraphrases Graecize the text, including many phrases that are "non-Hebraic", being common in Greek but lacking an idiomatic counterpart in Hebrew. Luke knows this Mark-like Hebraic Proto-Narrative, but does not know the Gospel of Mark as we know it today.

While it is easy to show that Luke knows a Proto-Mark (which happens to be closer to Hebrew) and not Mark, Lindsey speculates further with more surprising conclusions, and argues for Lucan priority. Thus, the first gospel texts are in Hebrew. These were translated into Greek as the Proto-Narrative and the collection of sayings, often called Q. Luke knows PN and Q. Lindsey argues Mark knows both PN and Luke, as well as other New Testament documents, including Acts, James, and Paul's Corinthians 1&2, Thessalonians 1&2, and Romans. Then Matthew knows both PN and Mark (but not Luke). Matthew is faithful to both PN and Mark and weaves their texts together, thus often agrees with Luke through PN against Mark.

Despite the surprising claim that Mark depends partially on Luke, Lindsey emphasizes that his solution to the Synoptic Problem agrees substantially with the majority who hypothesize Marcan priority, since this Proto-Narrative is identical with "Ur-Markus", and that all three synoptic gospels - Luke, Mark, and Matthew - depend directly on the Proto-Narrative.

== Publications ==
- Jesus, Rabbi and Lord: The Hebrew Story of Jesus Behind Our Gospels, Oak Creek, WI: Cornerstone Publishing, 1990, ISBN 0-9623950-0-5
- The Jesus Sources, Tulsa, OK: Hakesher, 1990
- A Comparative Greek Concordance of the Synoptic Gospels, 3 volumes, Jerusalem: Dugit, 1985-1989 (volume 1, volume 2, and volume 3 on the internet archive)
- A Hebrew Translation of the Gospel of Mark: A Greek-Hebrew Diglot with English Introduction, Second Edition, Jerusalem: Dugit, 1973
- "A Modified Two-Document Theory of the Synoptic Dependence and Interdependence" in Novum Testamentum 6 (1963), 239–263.
- "From Luke to Mark to Matthew: A Discussion of the Sources of Markan “Pick-ups” and the Use of a Basic Non-canonical Source by All the Synoptists," on JerusalemPerspective.com.
- "Gospel Origins: From a Hebrew Story to the Canonical Gospels," on JerusalemPerspective.com.
- "The Hebrew Life of Jesus," on JerusalemPerspective.com.
- "Introduction to A Hebrew Translation of the Gospel of Mark," on JerusalemPerspective.com.
- "An Introduction to Synoptic Studies," on JerusalemPerspective.com.
- "Jesus’ Twin Parables," on JerusalemPerspective.com.
- "The Kingdom of God: God’s Power Among Believers," on JerusalemPerspective.com.
- "The Major Importance of the “Minor” Agreements," on JerusalemPerspective.com.
- "Measuring the Disparity Between Matthew, Mark and Luke," on JerusalemPerspective.com.
- "My Search for the Synoptic Problem’s Solution (1959-1969)," on JerusalemPerspective.com.
- "A New Approach to the Synoptic Gospels," on JerusalemPerspective.com.
- "A New Two-source Solution to the Synoptic Problem," on JerusalemPerspective.com.
- "Paraphrastic Gospels," on JerusalemPerspective.com.
- "Unlocking the Synoptic Problem: Four Keys for Better Understanding Jesus," on JerusalemPerspective.com.
- "“Verily” or “Amen”—What Did Jesus Say?," on JerusalemPerspective.com.

== See also ==
- Jerusalem school hypothesis
