= Paul Young (disambiguation) =

Paul Young (born 1956) is an English rock and pop musician.

Paul Young may also refer to:

== People ==
=== Arts and entertainment ===
- Paul Young (actor) (born 1944), Scottish actor
- Paul Young (producer) (born 1967), Irish animator and film producer, who co-developed The Secret of Kells
- Paul Young (singer, born 1947) (1947–2000), English rock musician with Sad Café and Mike & The Mechanics
- Paul A. Young (born 1973), English pastry chef
- William P. Young (born 1955), or Paul Young, Canadian author

=== Sports ===
- Paul Young (American football) (1908–1978), American NFL center
- Paul Young (footballer, born 1968), Jamaican forward
- Paul Young (rugby union) (born 1983), Welsh hooker
- Paul Young (motorcyclist) (born 1969), Australian Grand Prix motorcycle racer
- Paul H. Young (1890–1960), American angler
- Paul Young, tennis coach at Louisiana State University

=== Other people ===
- Paul Thomas Young (1892–1978), American psychologist
- Paul Young (American politician) (born 1979), Mayor of Memphis, Tennessee
- Paul Young (New Zealand politician), New Zealand politician
- R. Paul Young (born 1952), geophysicist

== Other uses ==
- Paul Young (album), a 1997 album by English singer Paul Young
- Paul Young (Desperate Housewives), a character on the ABC TV series Desperate Housewives

== See also ==
- John Paul Young (born 1950), Scottish-born Australian pop singer-songwriter
- Young (surname)
