= Henry Young (tennis) =

Australian centenarian World War II veteran and tennis player (born 1923)

Henry Young OAM
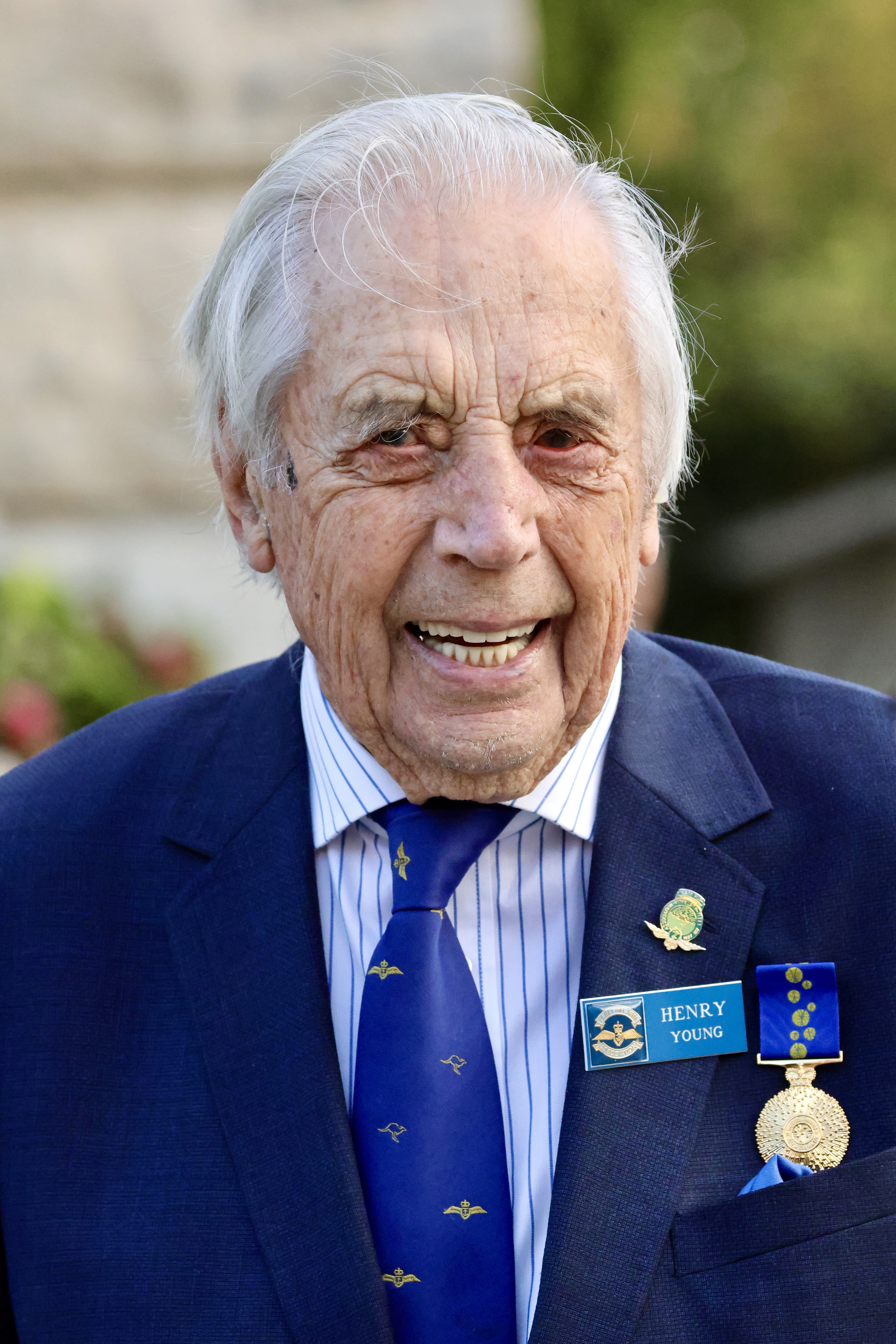
- Young in 2026
- Country (sports): Australia
- Born: Henry Samuel Calhoun Young; 26 September 1923 (age 102) Glenelg, Australia
- Military service
- Allegiance: Australia; United Kingdom
- Branch: Royal Australian Air Force; Royal Air Force
- Service years: 1942/43–19??
- Rank: Spitfire pilot
- Conflicts: World War II

Henry Samuel Calhoun Young (born 26 September 1923) is an Australian centenarian World War II veteran and tennis player, recognised as the world's oldest competitive tennis player. He has competed internationally in the 90+ category at ITF Masters tournaments and has made exhibition appearances at the Australian Open.

== Early life ==
Young was born on 26 September 1923 in Glenelg, Australia. He began playing tennis as a young man and continued to play regularly into his later years.

== World War II service ==
During World War II, he served as a spitfire pilot with both British and Australian air forces.

== Tennis career ==
=== Masters competition ===
Young has competed in numerous senior-level tournaments in Australia and abroad. In October 2023, shortly after turning 100, he took part in the ITF Masters World Individual Championships in Mallorca, Spain, competing in the men's singles 90+ category.

=== Australian Open exhibitions ===
In January 2023, Young appeared in an exhibition match dubbed the "Clash of the Centurions" in Rod Laver Arena during the Australian Open. The match featured other veteran players and raised awareness of senior participation in sport.

== Recognition ==
Young has been profiled by international media for his longevity and dedication to tennis. He plays tennis three to four times a week and continues to travel for competitions in his second century of life.

He is recognised by the Guinness World Records as the oldest competitive tennis player.

A documentary about his story titled Forever Young was released on 8 February 2026.

== Personal life ==
Young resides in Adelaide, South Australia. He was married to a woman named Madge for 72 years.
