= Kevin Young =

Kevin Young may refer to:

- Kevin Young (hurdler) (born 1966), American athlete, former world record holder in the 400 metres hurdles
- Kevin Young (baseball) (born 1969), American baseball player
- Kevin Young (basketball, born 1981), American basketball coach
- Kevin Young (basketball, born 1990), Puerto Rican-American basketball player
- Kevin Young (footballer) (born 1961), English footballer
- Kevin Young (ice hockey) (born 1982), Canadian professional ice hockey player
- Kevin Young (poet) (born 1970), American poet and head of the National Museum of African American History and Culture
- Kevin Young, singer of Disciple (band)
