= Charlie Young (disambiguation) =

Charlie Young is a fictional character on the TV series The West Wing

Charlie Young may also refer to:

- Charlie Young (baseball) (1893–1952), American baseball player
- Charlie Young (footballer, born 1877) (1877–1949), Australian rules football player for Melbourne
- Charlie Young (footballer, born 1918) (1918–1969), Australian rules football player for Fitzroy
- Charlie Young (actress) (born 1974), Taiwanese actress and singer

== See also ==
- Charley Young (born 1952), American football running back
- Charle Young (born 1951), American football tight end
- Charles Young (disambiguation)
