= Henry Young (deputy governor) =

Deputy Governor of Bombay

Deputy Governor of Bombay Presidency
- In office 1668 – 13 November 1669
- Governor: George Oxenden
- Preceded by: Office established

Henry Young was the first Deputy Governor of the Bombay Presidency from 1668 to 13 November 1669 after capture from the Dutch. Concurrent with the term of Sir George Oxenden, his term oversaw the establishment of Bombay and the arrival of is first urban residents.
