= Darren Young (disambiguation) =

Darren Young (born 1983) is a ring name of American professional wrestler Fred Rosser.

Darren Young may also refer to:

- Darren Young (Scottish footballer) (born 1978), Scottish football player
- Darren Young (New Zealand footballer) (born 1981), New Zealand football defender
- Darren Young, candidate in United States House of Representatives elections, 2006
- Darren Young (athlete) in 2012 CARIFTA Games
- Darren Young (cyclist) in 2003 UCI Track Cycling World Cup Classics
- Darren Young (hurler) in Kerry Hurling Team 2003

== See also ==
- Darin Young (born 1973), American darts player
