= Emily Young (disambiguation) =

Emily Young (born 1951) is a British sculptor.

Emily Young may also refer to:

- Emily Young (film director) (born 1970), English film director and screenwriter
- Emily Young (skier) (born 1991), Canadian Paralympic cross-country skier and biathlete
- E. H. Young (Emily Hilda Young, 1880–1949), English novelist
- Emily Young (Stargate), a character in Stargate
- Emily Young (Twilight), a character in Twilight
- Emily Young, a former writer and host at Linus Media Group
