= Stephen Young =

Stephen Young may refer to:

- Stephen M. Young (1889–1984), Democratic United States senator
- Stephen Young (actor) (born 1939), Canadian actor
- Sir Stephen Young, 3rd Baronet (born 1947), Scottish official who headed the Fatal Accident Inquiry into the 1994 Chinook crash on Mull of Kintyre
- Stephen M. Young (diplomat) (born 1951), consul general of the United States of America in Hong Kong
- Stephen Scott Young (born 1957), American artist
- Stephen Young (businessman) (born 1955), British businessman, CEO of Meggitt
- Stephen Young (racing driver) (born 1969), American professional stock car racing driver
- Stephen G. Young (born 1952), American physician-scientist
- Stephen Young (economist) (1944–2021), Scottish scholar in the field of international business
- USS Stephen Young, one of the ships of the Stone Fleet, sunk in the harbor of Charleston, South Carolina

== See also ==
- Steve Young (disambiguation)
