= Jane Young =

Jane Young may refer to:

- Jane Young (tennis) (born 1965), Canadian professional tennis player
- Jane Corner Young (1915–2001), American classical composer
- Jane E. Young, American lawyer and United States Attorney
