= Rachel Young =

Rachel Young may refer to:

- FBI Special Agent Rachel Young, main character of the 2008-2009 TV series, Eleventh Hour (U.S. TV series)
- Rachel Young née Chu (Rachel Chu Young), a main character in Crazy Rich Asians, China Rich Girlfriend, and Rich People Problems
- Rachel Young, a side character in the sci-fi audio drama Wolf 359 (podcast)
- Rachel Young (Home and Away), fictional character on Australian soap opera Home and Away

== See also ==
- Rachel (disambiguation)
- Young (disambiguation)
