= Ross Young (rugby union) =

Ross Young is the CEO of USA Rugby. He succeeded Dan Payne in April of 2018. Young previously was the General Manager at Harlequins before serving as the General Manager to Rugby World Cup Limited, for the 2003, 2007, and 2011 tournaments. Originally from the U.K., Young moved to the United States in 2013, where he was the CEO of Serevi Rugby, later rebranded as ATAVUS.
