= Thomas Young (footballer) =

Scottish footballer

Personal information
- Full name: Thomas Young
- Place of birth: Scotland
- Position: Full back

Senior career*
| Years | Team | Apps | (Gls) |
| 1936–1938 | Queen's Park | 11 | (0) |
| 1938 | Queen of the South | 1 | (0) |

International career
| 1936–1937 | Scotland Amateurs | 3 | (0) |
- * Club domestic league appearances and goals

Thomas Young was a Scottish amateur football outside left who played in the Scottish League for Queen's Park and Queen of the South. He was capped by Scotland at amateur level.
