= Frederick Young =

Frederick Young may refer to:

- Frederick Young (East India Company officer) (1786–1874), founder of the Sirmoor Battalion
- Frederick Young, perpetrator of the 2012 torture-murders of Jourdan Bobbish and Jacob Kudla in Detroit
- F. T. B. Young (Frederick Temple Blackwood Young, 1873–1940), merchant and political figure in New Brunswick, Canada
- Frederick C. Young (1896–?), his son, also merchant and political figure in New Brunswick, Canada
- Sir Frederick William Young (1876–1948), Australian politician
- Sir Frederick Young (writer) (1817–1913), traveller and writer on imperial affairs
- Frederic George Young (1858–1929), Oregon educator and historian, first editor of the Oregon Historical Quarterly
- Freddie Young (Frederick Archibald Young, 1902–1998), British cinematographer
- Fredd Young (Frederick Kimball Young, born 1961), American football player

== See also ==
- Fred Young (disambiguation)
