= Nick Young (disambiguation) =

Nick Young (born 1985) is an American basketball player.

Nick Young may also refer to:

- Nick Young (actor), American actor
- Nick Young (broadcast journalist) (born 1948), American broadcast journalist
- Nick Young (charity executive) (born 1952), chief executive of the British Red Cross
- Nick Young (character), fictional male lead of the Crazy Rich Asians novel and film franchise

== See also ==
- Nicholas Young (disambiguation)
- Nick Youngs (born 1959), English rugby union player
- Nick Youngquest (born 1983), Australian model and rugby league footballer
- Mick Young (1936−1996), Australian politician
