= Cliff Young =

Cliff Young may refer to:

- Cliff Young, founding member and vocalist of Caedmon's Call
- Cliff Young (athlete) (1922–2003), Australian potato farmer and athlete from Beech Forest, Victoria
- Cliff Young (baseball) (1964–1993), baseball pitcher
- Clifford E. Young (1883–1958), general authority of The Church of Jesus Christ of Latter-day Saints
- Clarence Clifton Young (1922–2016), known as Cliff, Nevada politician, member of the U.S. House of Representatives (1953–1957)
