= Andrew Young (mathematician) =

(1891–1968) Scottish mathematician, natural scientist and lawyer

Andrew White Young
- Born: 10 October 1891; Jedburgh, Roxburghshire, Scotland
- Died: 20 July 1968 (aged 76); Edinburgh, Scotland
- Education: George Watson's College
- Alma mater: University of Edinburgh
- Spouse: Margaret Macgregor
- Awards: FRSE; Donald Fraser Bursary; Vans Dunlop Scholarship
- Scientific career
- Fields: Mathematics, Natural Sciences, Law
- Institutions: University of St Andrews; London University; Messrs S. M. Bulley & Son; Messrs J. & R. A. Robertson

Andrew White Young FRSE WS (10 October 1891 – 20 July 1968) was a Scottish mathematician, natural scientist, and lawyer. He conducted research on Temperature Seiches in Loch Earn and presented papers on Mathieu function and Lagrange polynomials. He was elected a Fellow of Royal Society of Edinburgh in 1937.

== Life ==
Young was born on 10 October 1891 in Roxburghshire, Scotland. His father was Thomas Young, a schoolmaster at Lanton. His early education was at Townshead Public School, Montrose, Broughton High School, Edinburgh and finally George Watson's College where he showed an aptitude for a wide range of subjects, including English, Latin, Greek and Mathematics. At Edinburg University he obtained an MA (first class) in Mathematics (July 1913) and a BSc (special distinction) in Mathematics and Natural Philosophy (1914). In 1913 he was awarded the Donald Fraser Bursary (Experimental Physics) and the Vans Dunlop Scholarship (Mathematics), among others.

In 1913, Young joined the Edinburgh Mathematical Society and from 1914 to 1919 he lectured at the University of St Andrews and London University and published several papers. In February 1914 he presented a paper On the quasi-periodic solutions of Mathieu's differential equation at the Edinburgh Mathematical Society. In 1916 he presented On the Computation of a Lagrangian Interpolation.

Seiche: A standing wave in an enclosed or partially enclosed body of water

Of particular importance was the research he conducted with Ernest M. Wedderburn on Temperature Seiches in Loch Earn, which was published in several parts in the journal Transactions of the Royal Society of Edinburgh. This research was still being referenced as late as 2017.

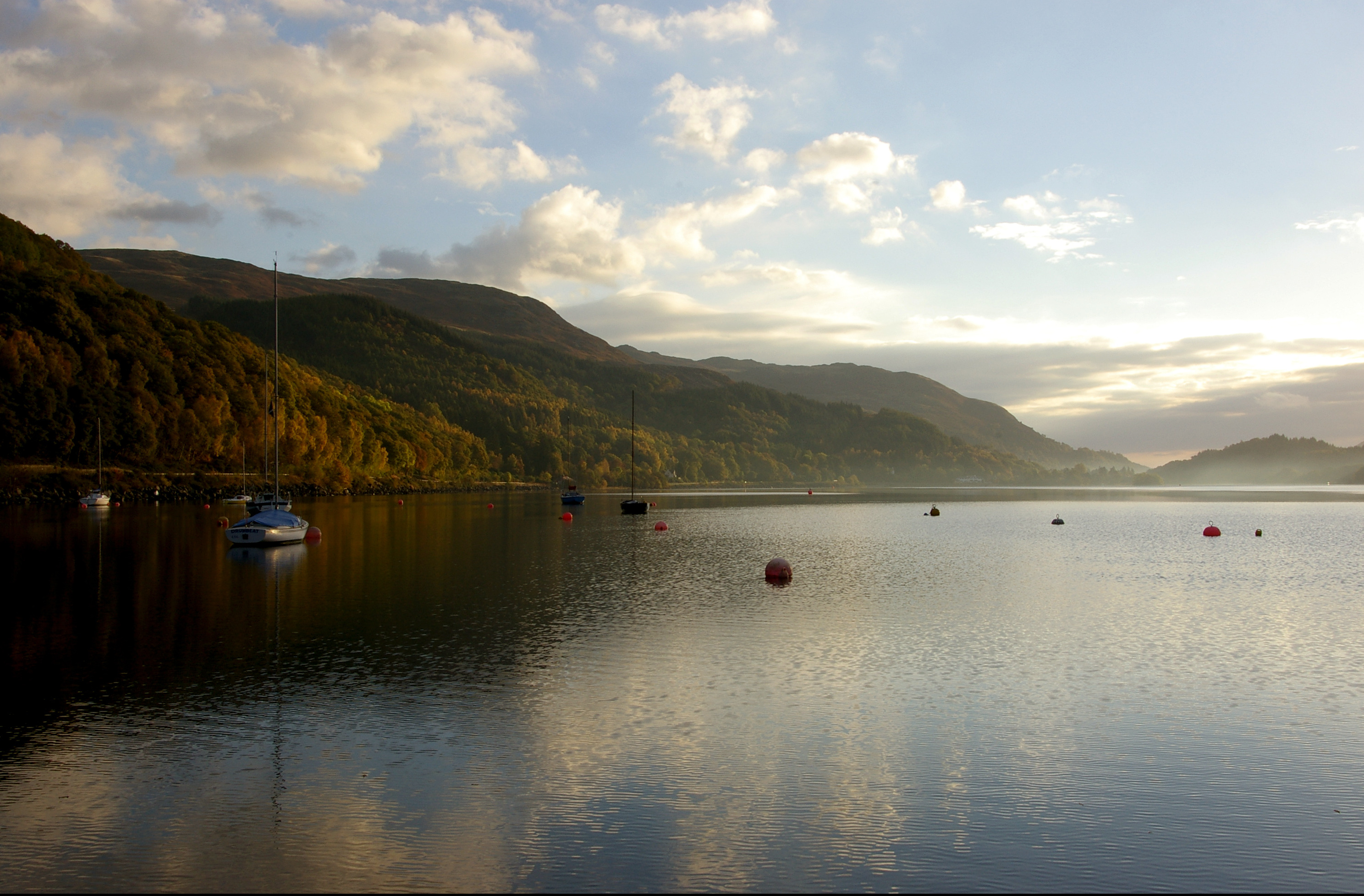
Loch Earn

In 1919, Young joined the company of Messrs S. M. Bulley & Son, Cotton Merchants in Liverpool and represented them in Bremen, Germany until 1926. Young married Margaret Macgregor in 1920.

In 1926, he returned to the University of Edinburgh and obtained an LLB in 1929 and became a Writer to the Signet, again under E.M. Wedderburn. He joined the firm of Messrs J. & R. A. Robertson, Writers to the Signet as a partner.

Throughout his life, he retained an interest in mathematics, science and law. He was elected a Fellow of Royal Society of Edinburgh on 1 March 1937, his proposers being Charles H. O'Donoghue, Alexander C. Aitken, Ernest Wedderburn and Edmund T. Whittaker. From 1947 to 1957, he was Treasurer of the Royal Society of Edinburgh and from 1958 to 1960 he served as its Vice-President.

Young died on 20 July 1968 after a period of illness.

== See also ==
- Mathieu's differential equation
- Lagrangian interpolation

== Sources ==
- Andrew White Young, M.A., BSc, LL.B. (Edin.), W.S., Royal Society of Edinburgh Year Book 1970, 53–54.
