= Tim Young =

Timothy or Tim Young may refer to:

- Tim Young (basketball) (born 1976), American basketball player
- Tim Young (ice hockey) (born 1955), Canadian ice hockey forward
- Tim Young (baseball) (born 1973), American baseball pitcher
- Tim Young (American rower) (born 1969), American rower
- Tim Young (Australian rower) (born 1956), Australian rower
- Timothy R. Young (1811–1898), U.S. Representative from Illinois
- Timothy Young (Saw), a character in the Saw films
