= Harold Young =

Harold Young may refer to:

- Harold Young (politician) (1923–2006), Australian Senate member, 1968–1983
- Harold Young (filmmaker) (1897–1972), American film director
- Hal Young (1890–1970), British cinematographer
- Harold Young (rugby league), rugby league footballer of the 1920s and 1930s

== See also ==
- Harry Young (disambiguation)
