= Fred E. Young =

Fred E. Young (April 6, 1919 – June 6, 2005) was an American biblical scholar who served as professor of Old Testament studies and dean at Central Baptist Theological Seminary in Kansas City. He is noted as the author of the Kansas Qumran Bibliographic Project, a collection of everything written on or about the Dead Sea Scrolls.

== Early life and education ==
Young was born in Watsontown, Pennsylvania, but lived more than fifty years in the Kansas City area. After graduating from Practical Bible Training School (1939) and William Jewell College (1947), he earned his Ph.D. from Dropsie College in Hebrew studies and ancient languages.

== Career ==
Young served on the translation team for the original New American Standard Bible, and as interim pastor in at least 15 congregations in Kansas. He retired in 1988 after 33 years as professor and dean at Central Baptist Theological Seminary. Young is probably most well known for his efforts during his retirement years to catalog every book, article, or news story ever written about the Dead Sea Scrolls. He was also noted as a prolific traveler, having visiting more than 200 countries during his lifetime.
