= Thomas Youngs =

Thomas or Tom Youngs may refer to:

- Tom Youngs (born 1987), rugby union hooker for Leicester Tigers
- Tom Youngs (footballer, born 1979) (1979–2025), English football assistant manager and forward
- Tom Youngs (footballer, born 1994), forward for Myrtleford Savoy SC
- Thomas Youngs (bef. 1760–aft. 1784), American politician in 7th New York State Legislature#Assemblymen

== See also ==
- Thomas Youngs House, Pittsford, Monroe County, New York
- Thomas Young (disambiguation)
