= Alexander Young =

Alexander Young may refer to:

- Alexander Young (bishop) (died 1684), 17th century Scottish prelate
- Alexander Young (engineer) (1833–1910), Scottish engineer and businessman who became a citizen of the Kingdom of Hawaii
- Alexander Young (musician) (1938–1997), Scottish guitarist and session musician
- Alexander Young (New Zealand politician) (1875–1956), New Zealand politician
- Alexander Young (tenor) (1920–2000), English tenor
- Alexander Young (VC) (1873–1916), Victoria Cross recipient
- Alexander MacGillivray Young (1878–1939), Canadian politician
- Alexander Bell Filson Young (1876–1938), better known as Filson Young, an Irish journalist
- Alex Young (footballer, born 1880) (1880–1959), Scottish professional footballer
- Alex Young (footballer, born 1937) (1937–2017), Scottish professional footballer
- Alexander Young (historian) (1800–1854), American minister

== See also ==
- Alex Young (disambiguation)
  - Alexander Young Building, a former building in Honolulu, demolished in 1981
