= ANDI (singer) =

Australian musician

ANDI (Andi Young)
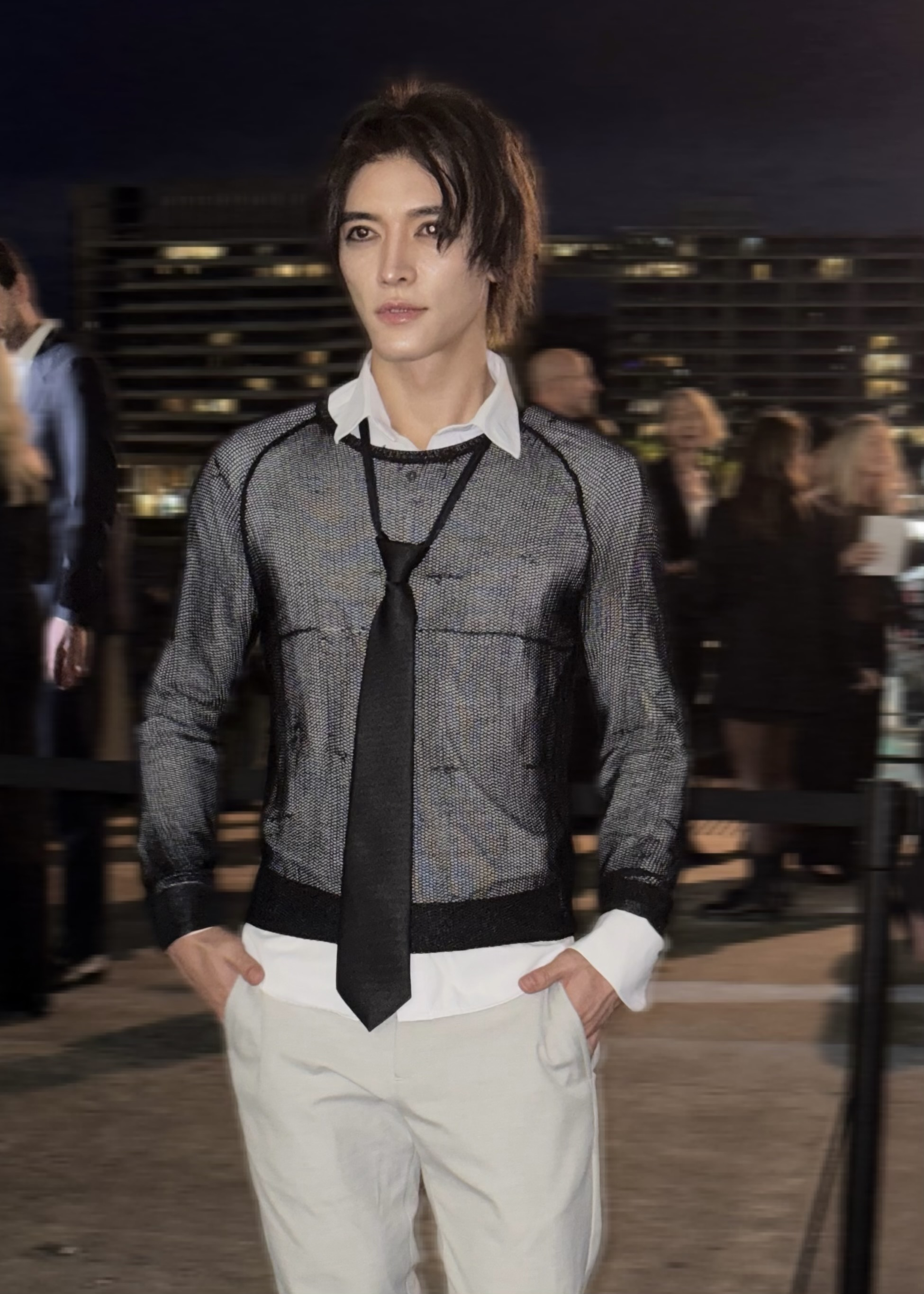
- Young at Australian Fashion Week 2025

Background information
- Genres: pop, rock
- Occupations: singer; songwriter; model
- Years active: 2015–present

ANDI (Andi Young) is a singer, songwriter, violinist, and model, who started his career in the US. He creates a combination of modern pop and classical music, embracing vulnerability and human nature.

== Early years ==
ANDI (Andi Young) is an Australian artist of Chinese descent. He started to learn violin at the age of 4 and vocals and dance at the age of 8. While attending high school he participated in talent shows and toured around Europe. After Europe, he relocated to South Korea to pursue K-pop training. His Korean period was one of the most difficult times of his life due to an extreme gap in communication, yet it contributed heavily to shaping him up as a singer. After Korea Young moved to Australia where he applied for being a composition student at a music conservatory. But later, encouraged by the head of the composition department, Young passed up formal training in favour of creating the music his own way.

== Musical career ==
Andi Young started his career by uploading songs to the music-sharing website SoundCloud. His debut song "Time To Say Goodbye" gained more than one million listeners within its first week and topped Singer/Songwriter chart. The track demonstrates Young's ability to harness his voice and creates a dynamic melancholy flair of bittersweet quality. His song "Star" took the runner-up position in the same category, and "You Go Left, I Go Right" topped the "Piano" list.

In September 2016 Andi Young released his official debut single "Lonely Child", an introspective and moody piece of work which reached the top 5 on the Taiwanese OMusic chart. Music video for the song premiered in Yahoo Music Taiwan.

In 2019 he released his first Mandarin single "Who Am I", a self-reflecting philosophical fusion of pop and rock.

=== "Still Believe in Love" ===
His first album Still Believe in Love was released on October, 2026. "It is a cinematic and emotionally honest creation that moves through heartbreak, desire, identity and the difficult decision to remain open after love falls apart." What makes this debut especially compelling is how seriously ANDI treats the production itself as part of that emotional journey, write critics.

Track list:

- The love that i want
- Still believe in love
- Stranger in the mirror
- I didn't lose you
- Do you even know
- Fine without you
- Everything will change
- Heartbeat
- Love me right now
- Blow me away
- World is big
- Take care
