= Nicholas Young =

Nicholas Young may refer to:

- Nicholas Young (executive) (1840–1916), baseball executive
- Nicholas Young (sailor) (1757–?), sailor on Captain James Cook's ship
- Nicholas Young (figure skater) (born 1982), Canadian figure skater
- Nicholas Young (actor) (born 1949), British actor
- Nicholas Young (mathematician), British mathematician
- Nicholas Yonge (c. 1560-1619), English composer

== See also ==
- Nick Youngs (born 1959), English rugby union player
- Nick Young (disambiguation)
