= Ernie Young (footballer, born 1893) =

English footballer (1893–1950)

Personal information
- Full name: Ernest Wilson Young
- Date of birth: 28 February 1893
- Place of birth: Thornaby-on-Tees, England
- Date of death: 28 February 1950 (aged 57)
- Place of death: Newcastle upon Tyne, England
- Height: 5 ft 8 1/2 in (1.74 m)
- Position: Centre forward

Senior career*
Years	Team	Apps	(Gls)
1920–1922	Middlesbrough	1	(0)
1922–1923	Darlington	13	(4)
1923–19??	Leadgate Park		
- * Club domestic league appearances and goals

Ernest Wilson Young (28 February 1893 – 28 February 1950) was an English footballer who played as a centre forward in the Football League for Middlesbrough and Darlington.

== Personal life ==
Young was born in Thornaby-on-Tees in February 1893, the son of Ernest Wilson Young, a railway worker, and his wife Lilly, and baptised in March of that year. The 1911 census records Young working as a railway clerk, and the oldest of five surviving children, all still living with their parents in the Newport district of Middlesbrough. The 1939 Register finds Young and his wife, Ada, living in Roberts Street, Scotswood. Young is employed as a traffic foreman and serving as an ARP warden. They were still resident at that address when Young died in the Royal Victoria Infirmary, Newcastle upon Tyne, in 1950 on his 57th birthday.

== Football career ==
Young made his senior debut for Middlesbrough on 23 April 1921 at home to Chelsea in the First Division, a match in which Middlesbrough made four changes to their forward line. In the first minute, Young "darted forward in threatening fashion, but finished his fine individual effort shooting just over the bar"; neither side's players could do better, and the match ended goalless. He was retained for the 1921–22 season, but made no more first-team appearances, and he signed for Third Division North runners-up Darlington in the summer of 1922, ahead of their second season in the Football League.

He was in competition with at least six other men for Darlington's centre-forward position, including Bill Hooper, normally an inside right, who had been the club's top scorer in 1921–22, and the veteran Dick Healey. Young played in 13 of the 42 league matches, and scored four league goals, including a pair on Christmas Day against local rivals Hartlepools United. Together with Darlington teammate Bob Mitcheson, Young left the club at the end of the season to play in the North-Eastern League for Leadgate Park.
