= Charles L. Young Sr. =

American politician

Charles Lemuel Young Sr. (August 27, 1931 – April 29, 2009) was an American businessman, veteran of the Korean War who earned a Bronze Star, and politician in Mississippi. He advanced in the family business started by his father, becoming president in 1969 and expanding the sale of E.F. Young Jr. Manufacturing Company products into markets in Canada and the Caribbean. In 1980 he was elected to the Mississippi State Legislature, and was repeatedly re-elected, serving nearly three decades from Meridian, Mississippi, until his death.

== Biography ==
Charles Lemuel Young Sr. was born in Meridian, Mississippi, in Lauderdale County, the eldest son and second of three children of E. F. Young Jr., an African-American entrepreneur and Velma Beal (November 4, 1902–February 1987).

The year he was born, his father E. F. Young Jr. founded the E. F. Young Jr. Manufacturing Company in Meridian, Mississippi. Within a few years, he built it up as one of the most prominent black-owned businesses in the South. Like his two siblings, Young would be exposed to the family business at an early age. In 1950, while he was attending Tennessee State University, a historically black college in Nashville, his father died.

After graduating in 1951, Young entered the US Army and served in the Korean War. He was awarded the Bronze Star.

He married Doretha Connor of Port Arthur, Texas on August 4, 1960. They had four children together:

- Charles Lemuel "Chuck" Young Jr., served in the Mississippi House of Representatives, District 82 (2012–2024)
- Deidre Young-Milton
- Arthur S. Young
- Vel(dore) Young-Graham, serves as County Court Judge for Lauderdale County, Mississippi

=== E. F. Young Jr. Manufacturing Company ===
Young was actively involved with the family business for fifteen years, advancing to the position of president in 1969. Under his leadership, the company expanded its markets into Canada and the Caribbean, selling products for people of African descent.

As an entrepreneur, Young established himself in the local business community. He was the first African-American member of the Meridian Chamber of Commerce. He also became active in the Democratic Party, with which most African Americans affiliated after regaining the ability to vote under national civil rights legislation.

=== Electoral history ===
In 1980, Young was elected to the Mississippi House of Representatives. He was repeatedly re-elected, serving for almost three decades until his death.

=== 2003 ===
Mississippi House of Representatives Democratic primary (82nd district)
| Party | Candidate | Votes | % |
|---|---|---|---|
| Democratic | Charles L. Young Sr. (incumbent) | 1,315 | 100.00 |

Mississippi House of Representatives general election (82nd district)
| Party | Candidate | Votes | % |
|---|---|---|---|
| Democratic | Charles L. Young Sr. (incumbent) | 4,299 | 100.00 |

=== 2007 ===
Mississippi House of Representatives Democratic primary (82nd district)
| Party | Candidate | Votes | % |
|---|---|---|---|
| Democratic | Charles L. Young Sr. (incumbent) | 1,668 | 100.00 |

Mississippi House of Representatives general election (82nd district)
| Party | Candidate | Votes | % |
|---|---|---|---|
| Republican | Bobby Ray Smith | 1,248 | 34.07 |
| Democratic | Charles L. Young Sr. (incumbent) | 2,415 | 65.93 |

His son, Charles Jr., was elected to his former seat in 2012.

=== Death ===
Young suffered a massive heart attack and died at the Rush Foundation Hospital in Meridian, Mississippi on Wednesday, April 29, 2009.
