= Mighty Joe Young =

Mighty Joe Young may refer to:

- Mighty Joe Young (1949 film)
- Mighty Joe Young (1998 film)
- Mighty Joe Young (musician), blues musician
- the original name for Stone Temple Pilots, who recorded the Mighty Joe Young Demo before changing their name
