= Roger Young =

Rodger or Roger Young may refer to:

== People ==
- Roger Arliner Young (1899–1964), American biologist
- Rodger Young (1918–1943), American World War II Medal of Honor recipient
- Roger Young (politician) (born 1941), Canadian politician
- Roger Young (director) (born 1942), American television director
- Roger Young (rugby union) (born 1943), Ireland and British Lions player
- Roger Young (cyclist) (born 1953), American Olympic cyclist

== Other uses ==
- Rodger Young Village, a 1946 Los Angeles public housing project
- TFCT Rodger Young, a fictional starship in the novel Starship Troopers
- "Rodger Young", a 1964 episode of the TV series The Great Adventure
- "The Ballad of Rodger Young" (1945), by Frank Loesser
