= Winty Young =

Canadian football player (born c. 1930)

Profile
- Positions: Guard, Tackle

Personal information
- Born: c. 1930 (age 95–96)
- Listed height: 5 ft 11 in (1.80 m)
- Listed weight: 225 lb (102 kg)

Career history
- 1953–1954: Winnipeg Blue Bombers
- 1955: BC Lions
- 1955: Winnipeg Blue Bombers

Wentworth Young (born c. 1930) was a Canadian professional football player who played for the Winnipeg Blue Bombers and BC Lions. He played college football at the University of British Columbia.
