= Steve Young (disambiguation) =

Steve Young (born 1961) is a retired American football quarterback and member of the Pro Football Hall of Fame.

Steve Young or Steven Young may also refer to:

- Steve Young (software engineer) (born 1951), British academic and entrepreneur
- Steve Young (musician) (1942–2016), country music singer, songwriter and guitarist
- Steve Young (writer), television writer
- Steve Young (police officer) (1953–2003), labor leader
- Stevie Young (born 1956), guitarist, member of AC/DC
- Steve Young (offensive tackle) (born 1953), American football tackle
- Steve Young (Alberta politician) (born 1969), politician in the Canadian province of Alberta
- Steve Young (basketball) (born 1949, "Steve Giatzoglou"), Greek-American professional basketball player
- Steve Young (Washington politician) (1950–2019), former mayor of Kennewick, Washington
- Steve Young, a telecommunications executive who flew into space on Blue Origin NS-22

== See also ==
- Stephen Young (disambiguation)
