= Harry Young =

Harry Young may refer to:

- Harry Young (American football) (1893–1977), member of the College Football Hall of Fame
- Harry Young (cyclist) (1882–1946), Canadian cyclist
- Harry Young (mayor), mayor of San Jose, California
- Harry Young (New Hampshire politician), state legislator
- Harry Young (musician) (1951–2023), Australian rock musician
- Harry Young (rugby league), rugby league footballer who played in the 1920s
- Harry Dove Young (1867–1944), vigneron and politician in South Australia
- Harry Young (socialist), British socialist activist
- Harry Young, who took part in the 1932 Young Brothers Massacre

== See also ==
- Henry Young (disambiguation)
- Harold Young (disambiguation)
- Harrison Young (1930–2005), actor
