= Howard Young =

Howard Young may refer to:

- Howard Young (politician) (born 1948), member of the Legislative Council of Hong Kong
- Howard Young Sr. (1879–1961), justice of the Indiana Supreme Court
- Howard E. Young (1871–1945), first African American licensed as a pharmacist in Maryland
- Howard Irving Young (1893–1952), American screenwriter and playwright
- Howie Young (1937–1999), Canadian ice hockey player and actor

== See also ==
- Howard R. Young Correctional Institution, a state prison in Wilmington, New Castle County, Delaware
