= Charles Young (Australian footballer) =

Australian rules footballer, born 1905

Personal information
- Full name: Charles Ernest Young
- Born: 26 October 1905; Kanowna, Western Australia
- Died: 10 June 1980 (aged 74); Burwood, Victoria

Playing career^{1}
Years	Club	Games (Goals)
1927	Melbourne	2 (0)
1928	Coburg (VFA)	6 (1)
1929–33	Sandringham (VFA)	85 (0)
- ^{1} Playing statistics correct to the end of 1933.

Charles Ernest Young (26 October 1905 – 10 June 1980) was an Australian rules footballer who played with Melbourne in the Victorian Football League (VFL).
