= Nat Young (disambiguation) =

Nat or Nathan Young may refer to:

- Nat Young (born 1947), Australian surfing champion
- Nathan Young, fictional character in Misfits
- Nathan Young, drummer in Anberlin
- Nathan B. Young (1862–1933), American educator
- Nathan Young (curler) (born 2002), Canadian curler
- Nathan Young-Coombes (born 2003), English footballer
