= Gerald Young =

Gerald Young may refer to:

- Gerald Young (baseball) (born 1964), former baseball outfielder
- Gerald O. Young (1930–1990), United States Air Force officer and Medal of Honor recipient
- Gerry Young (1936–2020), English former footballer
- Gerald L. Young, ecologist
- Gerald R. Young (1929–2021), American intelligence official
