= What Happens at The Abbey =

- Genre: Reality television
- Starring: David Cooley; Brandon Winn; Brandi Andrews; Lawrence Carroll; Murray Swanby; Cory Zwierzynski; Chelsea Jeffers; Billy Reilich; Ashlee Lian; Kim Senser; Elizabeth Steinle; Kyle Clarke; Marissa Chykirda; Daniel Eid
- Country of origin: United States
- Original language: English
- No. of seasons: 1
- No. of episodes: 7

Production
- Executive producers: David Goldberg; Caroline Baumgard; Ray Giuliani; David Cooley
- Production locations: Los Angeles, California; Palm Springs, California; Las Vegas, Nevada
- Camera setup: Multi-Camera
- Running time: 42 minutes
- Production company: Banijay Studios North America

Original release
- Network: E!
- Release: May 14 – June 25, 2017

What Happens at The Abbey is an American reality television series that premiered on the E! cable network on May 14, 2017. The show follows the lives of the employees who work at the West Hollywood, California nightclub, The Abbey.

== Cast ==
- David Cooley, the owner
- Brandon Winn, David's assistant
- Brandi Andrews, a VIP Host
- Lawrence Carroll, a VIP Host
- Murray Swanby, a VIP Host
- Cory Zwierzynski, a bartender
- Chelsea Jeffers, a management trainee
- Billy Reilich, a VIP server
- Ashlee Lian, Chelsea's friend
- Kim Senser, a server
- Elizabeth Steinle, a server
- Kyle Clarke, a bartender
- Marissa Chykirda, a new server
- Daniel Eid, a server

== Production ==
A preview trailer for What Happens at The Abbey was released on March 28, 2017.

The show premiered on May 14, 2017.

During a live video on Instagram, on June 22, Lawrence announced that What Happens at The Abbey was not picked up for a second season.

== Episodes ==
No.	Title	Original release date	U.S. viewers (millions)
1	"Welcome to The Abbey"	May 14, 2017	0.37
2	"Chicken Leg Bitch"	May 21, 2017	0.42
3	"Homie Hopper"	May 28, 2017	0.34
4	"Weasel-Eyed Little Ferret"	June 4, 2017	0.33
5	"Gossip Girl Kyle"	June 11, 2017	0.30
6	"Vegas Bound"	June 18, 2017	0.31
7	"Stage Five Clinger"	June 25, 2017	0.23
