= Margaret Young (disambiguation) =

Margaret Young may refer to:

- Margaret Young (missionary) (1855–1940), Canadian missionary in Nagoya, Japan
- Margaret Paulin Young (1864–1953), Scottish headteacher
- Margaret Young (1891–1969), American performer
- Tui Manu'a Matelita (1872–1895), Queen of Manu'a in the late nineteenth century
- Margaret Buckner Young (1921–2009), American educator and author
- Baroness Young of Hornsey (1951)
- Margaret Blair Young (1955), American author, filmmaker and educator
