= Adam Young (disambiguation) =

Adam Young (born 1986) is an American musician.

Adam Young may also refer to:

== Real people ==
=== Musicians ===
- Adam Young (1987–2016), the former leader of the grindcore band Sockweb
- Adam Young (born 1980), Canadian musician, see 17th Canadian Folk Music Awards

=== Other people ===
- Adam Young (politician) (born 1982), a former member of the West Virginia House of Delegates
- Adam Young, the founder of Adam Young Inc., and Young Broadcasting

== Fictional characters ==
- Adam Young, a fictional child prodigy on the television show Mr. Young
- Adam Young, the innocent Anti-Christ in the novel Good Omens
