= Alex Young (Australian footballer) =

Australian rules footballer (1879–1963)

Personal information
- Full name: Alexander Young
- Born: 7 October 1879; Oakleigh, Victoria
- Died: 30 June 1963 (aged 83); Glen Huntly, Victoria
- Original team: Middle Brighton Juniors

Playing career^{1}
Years	Club	Games (Goals)
1899	St Kilda	1 (0)
- ^{1} Playing statistics correct to the end of 1899.

Alex Young (7 October 1879 – 30 June 1963) was an Australian rules footballer who played for the St Kilda Football Club in the Victorian Football League (VFL).
