= Jerusalem School of Synoptic Research =

Consortium of Jewish and Christian scholars

The Jerusalem School of Synoptic Research is a consortium of Jewish and Christian scholars that study the Synoptic Gospels in light of the historic, linguistic and cultural milieu of Jesus. The beginnings of the collegial relationships that formed the Jerusalem School of Synoptic Research can be traced back to David Flusser and Robert L. Lindsey in the 1960s.

== Viewpoints ==
The consortium's own website states three assumptions, shared by its members

- the importance of Hebrew language
- the relevance of Jewish culture
- the significance of Semitisms underneath sections of the Synoptic Gospels that in turn often yield results to the interconnection (of dependence) between the Synoptic Gospels.

The first two assumptions are perhaps not shared by the majority of New Testament scholars, but are neither considered to be fringe positions. Today, the common view is that Jesus and his milieu spoke Aramaic, however that Hebrew was spoken and even important is not unique to the Jerusalem School. John P. Meier criticizes scholarship in the twentieth century that has paid lip service to the 'Jewish Jesus' but has not really fleshed this out, stating that if we do not have a halachic Jesus, we don't have an historical Jesus.

The third assumption of the Jerusalem School basically seems to be concerned with not holding to an assumed-default position of Marcan priority. It is especially the third assumption in more individually pronounced forms that has invited a response of the academic community. Some scholars have perceived the Jerusalem School as a group that holds to Lukan priority. But this perception is incomplete since it is only Robert Lindsey and David Bivin who have argued strongly for Lukan priority. The third methodological assumption of the Jerusalem School is much broader and open, without any one theory being affirmed:

Tracing the linguistic and cultural data within the Synoptic Gospels leads to insights into their literary relationships The Synoptic Gospels provide linguistic, literary, social, geographical and cultural clues to their internal structure and development. The evangelists composed their works in Greek, yet Semitic idioms are readily evident in all three. The gospels' Greek and Semitic linguistic elements and Jewish cultural items must be identified, carefully traced through the three gospels, and then incorporated into a theory of synoptic relationships."

Many scholars affirm the Semitic quality of the Synoptic Gospel material as indicative of earlier material, but how to determine Semitic quality has been hotly debated. Recently this subject of a Hebrew Gospel and Semitic material has been discussed by James R. Edwards (although with somewhat differing results than Jerusalem School members). The most extensive Jerusalem School publication on Semitic material and types of Semitic interference can be found in an extended essay and appendix (critical notes) in Jesus' Last Week (Leiden: Brill, 2006).

== Publications ==
Apart from extensive individual publications of the school's members that often reflect the Jerusalem School's approach (some of which are footnoted here), some members have bundled some of their efforts in a joint effort. This combined effort from members of the Jerusalem School of Synoptic Research resulted in thus far two volumes. The first volume (2006) is Jesus' Last Week: Jerusalem Studies in the Synoptic Gospels — Volume One, edited by R. Steven Notley, Marc Turnage, and Brian Becker. The second volume (2014) is The language environment of first century Judaea : Jerusalem studies in the Synoptic Gospels — Volume Two, edited by Buth, R. and Notley.

== Reactions and criticism ==
Both affirmation and strong criticism followed the publication of a co-authored book Understanding the Difficult Words of Jesus by David Bivin and Roy B. Blizzard Jr. which was reviewed by Michael L. Brown. Brown wrote:

In the event that JSSR devotes its primary efforts to: 1) the sober elucidation of texts which New Testament scholarship recognizes as difficult and obscure; 2) providing Jewish background to the Scriptures; 3) and shedding light on Semitic nuances of biblical words and phrases, then all of us can glean from their work. Should the Jerusalem School continue to devote itself primarily to the hypothetical work of retranslation and reconstruction, then their potential contribution to the ongoing ministry of the Word would be relegated to relative unimportance.

A further academic description of the Jerusalem School and its methodology and dissemination in the lay and academic field is found in Hebräisches Evangelium und synoptische Überlieferung: Untersuchungen zum hebräischen Hintergrund der Evangelien.

== Jesus' Last Week ==
The recent combined effort of Jerusalem School members in Jesus' Last Week: Jerusalem Studies in the Synoptic Gospels - Volume One, a work clearly catered toward the academic community has received positive reviews, for example by Nina L. Collins in the journal Novum Testamentum. She closed her review by stating that:

This book is a product of the Jerusalem School of Synoptic Research... There is little doubt that, like the bird cage in Alexandria, this devoted beit knesset of properly equipped scholars has produced a perceptive set of essays, and it will be interesting to see the further insights that future volumes in this series will almost certainly produce.

Other reactions have also been positive, as exemplified by Robert L. Webb's review in the Journal for the Study of the Historical Jesus:

This fascinating collection of essays demonstrates the fruitfulness of ‘collaboration between Jewish and Christian members’ of the School as they continue to study the Synoptic Gospels together.

A mixed review found the overall discussion in the volume to be "stimulating, even provocative from the perspective of current critical Synoptic studies." However, the review contained also some concerns:

While there may be something to Semitic influences, contributors routinely fail to draw the reader’s attention to the speculation necessarily involved with it as a working methodological assumption. Furthermore, the contributors do not seem to engage with much critical reflection on the scholarly discussion on Semitic influences, background, or interfaces with the Synoptic texts as we have them in Greek, even finding wordplays and strings of linguistic connections based on alleged Semitic originals, which we do not have. There seems to be a prevailing assumption that “taking seriously” the trilingual context of Jesus’ setting and that of the Synoptics itself mandates a Semitic Vorlage.

== See also ==
- Jerusalem school hypothesis
- Synoptic problem
