= Donald Young =

Donald or Don Young may refer to:

- Don Young (1933–2022), American politician from Alaska
- Donald A. Young (1929–2015), Canadian agriculturalist
- Donald Young (baseball) (Don Young, 1945–2024), American baseball player
- Donald Young (tennis) (born 1989), American tennis player
- Donald Gary Young (1949–2018), American businessman
- Donald Anthony Walker Young, ran a Ponzi scheme
- Donnie Young (police officer), Denver police detective who was shot and killed
- Donny Young, an early recording name of Johnny Paycheck (1938-2003)
- Don John Young (1910–1996), United States federal judge
- Don Carlos Young (1855–1938), American architect
- Don Young (bishop) (born 1944), bishop of Central Newfoundland
- Donald Young (choir director) (1960–2007), Choir Director and Deacon of Trinity United Church
