= Jerusalem school hypothesis =

Hypothesis for the synoptic problem

Jerusalem School hypothesis

Theory Information
- Order: A, R, Lucan priority Mark; Matt
- Additional Sources: A, R

Gospels' Sources
- Matthew: A, Mark
- Mark: A, Luke
- Luke: A, R

Theory History
- Originator: Robert Lisle Lindsey (independently) William Lockton
- Proponents: David Flusser

The Jerusalem School Hypothesis is one of many possible solutions to the synoptic problem, that the Gospel of Luke and the Gospel of Matthew both relied on older texts which are now lost. It was developed by Robert Lindsey, from the Jerusalem School of Synoptic Research.

The Jerusalem School of Synoptic Research is a group of individuals made up of "Jewish and Christian scholars collaborating in the land and language of Jesus; bringing historical, linguistic and critical expertise to bear on the synoptic gospels." Since the Jerusalem School does not hold to one theory as definitive for the synoptic problem, the Hypothesis label can be misleading. The term "Jerusalem School Hypothesis" is used by some to refer more generally to the threefold assumptions of the Jerusalem School of Synoptic Research: Hebrew language, Jewish Culture, and Synoptic Relationships, as the basis for explaining the timeline of the Gospels. The Jerusalem School believes that Hebrew should stand along with Greek and Aramaic, as fundamentally important for analyzing the synoptic Gospels, that ancient Jewish Culture, significantly preserved in Rabbinic literature and the Dead Sea Scrolls is carefully engaged in the study of the Synoptic Gospels, and that with the Synoptic Gospels, Greek and Semitic linguistic elements and Jewish cultural items should be identified and carefully traced for a theory of synoptic relationships.

== Overview ==
In 1922, William Lockton argued that Mark copied from Luke and in turn was copied by Matthew, who also copied material from Luke. In 1963, Robert Lisle Lindsey, one of the founding members of the Jerusalem School of Synoptic Research, independently discovered a similar solution to the synoptic problem. In Lindsey's theory, Matthew copied from Mark but did not know Luke directly. However, Lindsey argued that the synoptic authors all used two other documents for background material, unknown to scholars. These were:

1. A Hebrew biography of Jesus
2. A literal Greek translation of that original

== Robert Lisle Lindsey 1917-1995 ==
Robert Lisle Lindsey was attempting to replace an earlier outdated Hebrew translation of the New Testament provided by Franz Delitzsch, who is known as a German Lutheran theologian and Hebraist. Robert Lindsey began by translating the Gospel of Mark, assuming it was the earliest of the Synoptic gospels. Mark's text is relatively Semitic; it contains hundreds of non-Semitisms, such as the often-repeated phrase "and immediately", which are not present in Lukan parallels. This suggested to Robert Lindsey that there could have been the possibility that Mark was copying Luke and not the other way around. Lindsey hypothesized that Matthew and Luke, and probably Mark, were aware of an "anthology of Jesus' words and deeds taken from the Greek translation of the Hebrew biography". Meaning that there must have been a collection of literary pieces (poems, short stories, etc.) of Jesus' words and teaching which derived from the Greek translation of the Hebrew biography document. As for the second source which is a 'Greek biography that attempted to reconstruct the story-order of the original Hebrew text and its Greek translation', Lindsey believes only Luke knew this.

To summarize, Lindsey suggests the following:

1. That Mark used Luke's writing, with little reference to the anthology
2. Matthew used both Mark's version and the anthology
3. Luke and Matthew did not know each other's gospels, but independently used the anthology.

Robert Lindsey is the author of A Hebrew Translation of the Gospel of Mark. This book is famous for the solution mentioned above. He argues the existence of a Proto-Mark gospel ('Ur Markus'), which was a highly literal translation from an originally Hebrew source into Greek, which he calls the Proto-Narrative. He notes that the text of the Gospel of Luke is the most authentic to this Proto-Narrative, especially in the minor agreements between Matthew and Luke against Mark. He says, "It is evident that Mark deviates by paraphrasing from the Proto-narrative." While it is easy to show that Luke knows a Proto-Mark and not Mark, Lindsey suggests further for Lukan priority.

== Lukan priority theory ==
Robert Lindsey suggested that the first gospel accounts are in Hebrew. These were translated into Greek as the Proto-Narrative and the collection of sayings "Q". Robert Lindsey says that canonical Luke knows both Proto-Narrative and Q. Canonical Mark knows both Proto-Narrative and Luke as well as the other New Testament documents. Matthew is thought to know the Proto-Narrative and Mark without having awareness of Luke. Matthew has both Proto-Narrative and Mark qualities by harmonizing their texts together, which agrees with Luke through Proto-Narrative against Mark. While Robert Lindsey's research and pioneering thoughts helped form the basis of what began the Jerusalem School of Synoptic Research, he was only one of the members of the Jerusalem School.

== Jerusalem School hypothesis ==
The Jerusalem School group has a number of scholars in Israel, most importantly Professor David Flusser of the Hebrew University, who has, at least in part, agreed with Lindsey's source theory. David Flusser (1917–2000) was a professor of early Christianity and Judaism of the Second Temple Period at the Hebrew University in Jerusalem. Lindsey was the strongest proponent that a Hebrew biography lies behind the Greek texts of the gospels. But Malcolm Lowe also co-authored an article with David Flusser on a pericope that suggested the importance of Matthew. These examples highlight the true nature of the "Jerusalem School Hypothesis" which is based upon the three pillars mentioned above and encourages the exploration of Semitic material and anteriority within all three Synoptic Gospels, noting that Luke often has more Semitic-sounding material.

The Jerusalem School of Synoptic Research believes that by discussing the Greek texts and seeing how they fit in Hebrew (or Aramaic), they can better grasp the message within the Synoptic Gospels. Through linguistic, archaeological, and cultural discussion of the Greek text in light of its Hebraic context, the Jerusalem School attempts to fuller understanding of the text's original meaning. With the emphasis on Hebrew, the Jerusalem School scholars are in some way following the pioneering work of M.H. Segal and Abba BenDavid. Segal suggested, as early as 1908, that Mishnaic Hebrew shows the character of a living language and that the Jewish people in the land of Israel, at the time of Jesus, used Hebrew as their primary spoken and written language. Understanding how the Synoptic Gospels work and relate within the context of the language, land, and culture in which Jesus lived is more common than it was decades ago in its beginnings, but its vision and gatherings still provide a unique opportunity for Jews and Christians to gather around Greek Synoptic Gospel texts and discuss them in modern Hebrew.

== See also ==
- Two-source hypothesis

== Bibliography ==
- David Bivin (1997, August 5). An overview of the Jerusalem School Hypothesis
- “Hebraist”. 2000. The Free Dictionary
- “Jerusalem School of Synoptic Research”
- Lindsey, Robert. (1969). A Hebrew translation of the Gospel of Mark. California: Dugith Publications.
- Lindsey, Robert. (1963). A Modified Two-Document Theory of the Synoptic Dependence and Interdependence. Novum Testamentum 6 (1963), 239–263.
- Lindsey, Robert. (1990). The Jesus Sources: Understanding the Gospels.
- Lockton, William. (1922). The Origin of the Gospels. Church Quarterly Review 94 (1922), 216–239.
- Notley, R. Steven, M. Turnage, and B. Becker, eds. Jesus' Last Week: Jerusalem Studies on the Synoptic Gospels. Jewish and Christian Perspectives Series 11. Leiden: Brill, 2006.
- Ronning, Halvor. "Why I Am a Member of the Jerusalem School." Jerusalem Perspective 48 (1995): 22–27.
- Young, Brad H. Jesus and His Jewish Parables: Rediscovering the Roots of Jesus' Teaching. Edited by C.S.P. Lawrence Boadt, Theological Inquires: Studies in Contemporary Biblical and Theological Problems. New York: Paulist, 1989; reprinted 1999, Tulsa: Gospel Research.
