= E. F. Young Jr. =

American businessman

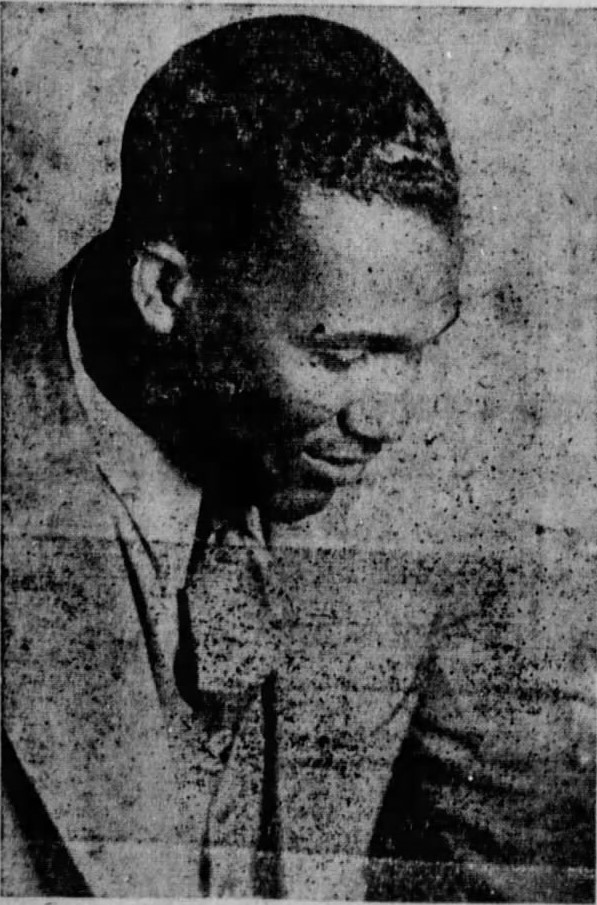
E. F. Young Jr. ca 1940

E. F. Young Jr. (July 13, 1898 – May 4, 1950) was an American businessman in Meridian, Mississippi, who built a business related to services, such as barber shops and beauty shops. He also manufactured and sold hair care products developed for African Americans. Young manufactured products in Chicago, Illinois, and Meridian.

He also owned and operated the E. F. Young Hotel in Meridian. It was an important resource for black travelers in the years of segregation and provided good lodging. In 2007, the Young Hotel was listed as a contributing property to the Meridian Downtown Historic District, which is listed on the National Register of Historic Places.

== Early years ==
Eugene Fred Young Jr. was born in 1898 in Russell, Mississippi, the son of E. F. Young Sr., a Methodist minister, farmer, and administrator, and his wife Maggie.

In 1927, after graduating from the Haven Institute in Meridian, Mississippi, Young set out to establish a business career. For an African-American man in the Jim Crow South, opportunities were few and far between. While in school, he worked part-time as a barber, which was a good service career at the time. Barbers had connections in the upper classes of both the white and black communities, as men used their services extensively before razors and electric shavers were widely available. Upon graduation, Young began working full-time as a barber to support his new wife, Velma, and growing family.

== Family ==
E. F. Young married Velma Beal in 1927. They had three children:

- Loyce Young [Daniels-De Augustino-Todd] (April 3, 1928 – November 9, 1994)
- Charles Lemuel Young Sr. (born August 27, 1931 – April 29, 2009)
- E(ugene) F(red) "Sonny" Young III

== Career ==
As a barber, Young realized that his African-American clients needed hair care products designed for them. As the demand for these products grew, he decided to start a company to manufacture them on a larger scale. In 1931, he established the E. F. Young Jr. Manufacturing Company. In 1933, his company received its trademark. By 1945, it had grown to one of the most successful black-owned businesses in the South.

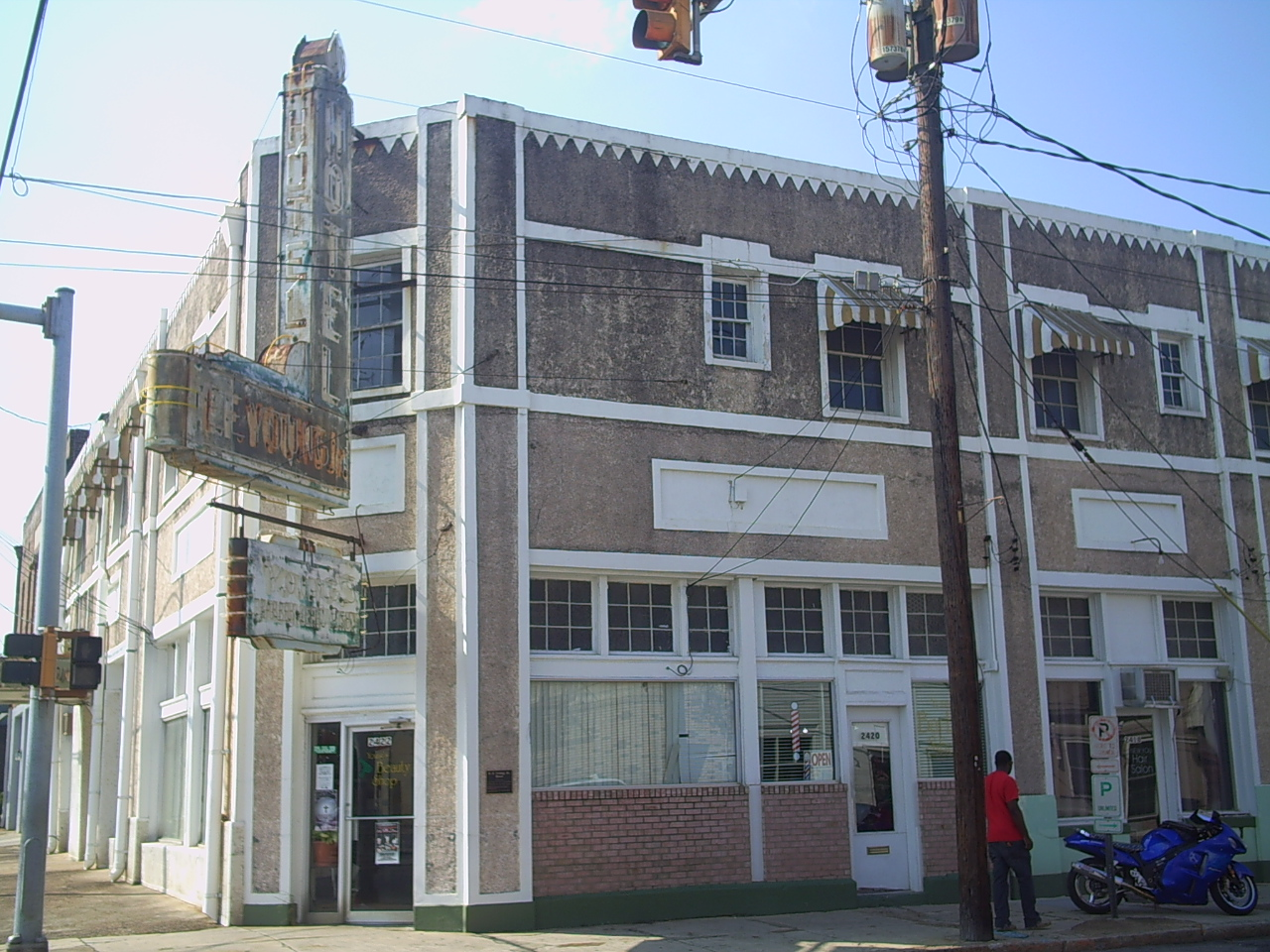
E. F. Young Hotel in Meridian, Mississippi

Young also bought and operated a hotel in Meridian, naming it the E. F. Young Hotel, and operated a barbershop in the hotel. At a time when African Americans were legally excluded from white facilities by Jim Crow laws of segregation, it provided good quarters for black travelers. In 2007, the Young Hotel was listed as a contributing property to the Meridian Downtown Historic District.

After a long terminal illness, Young died on May 4, 1950, just nine days after his father. His widow assumed control of the business. Their eldest son, Charles L. Young Sr., took over the operation as president in 1969. He served as president of the company until he died in 2009. The company distributes its line of products throughout the United States. Charles Young Sr. expanded its products to markets in Canada and the Caribbean. Charles Young Sr. also entered politics, serving as a representative from Meridian in the state legislature from 1981 to his death.

== Legacy ==
- The E. F. Young Hotel was listed as a contributing property of the Meridian Historic District on the National Register of Historic Places.
- The E. F. Young Company continues to operate and has expanded its international distribution of its products.

== Notes ==
The 1900 U.S. Census records Young's birth month as July 1898. His World War I draft card recorded his birthday as July 13, 1900. The July 13, 1898, date is likely accurate.
