= Joseph Young (disambiguation) =

Joseph Young (1797–1881) was an early leader of the Church of Jesus Christ of Latter-day Saints; brother to Brigham Young.

Joseph Young may also refer to:

- Joseph Young (artist) (1919–2007), American artist
- Joseph Young (conductor) (born 1982), American orchestra conductor
- Joseph Young (trade unionist) (1858–?), British trade union leader
- Joseph Young Jr. (born 1964), American cartoonist and animator
- Joseph Angell Young (1834–1875), apostle of the Church of Jesus Christ of Latter-day Saints; eldest son of Brigham Young
- Joseph H. Young (1922–2015), American judge
- Joseph M. Young, American diplomat
- Joseph Young or Alton Milford Young (1884–1950), Ku Klux Klan member

== See also ==
- Joe Young (disambiguation)
- Joseph Wesley Young House, a historic home in Hollywood, Florida
