= Tommy Young (footballer) =

Scottish footballer

Personal information
- Full name: Thomas McIlwain Young
- Date of birth: 24 December 1947 (age 78)
- Place of birth: Glasgow, Scotland
- Height: 5 ft 11 in (1.80 m)
- Position: Midfielder

Youth career
- –1967: Stephen's Juveniles

Senior career*
Years	Team	Apps	(Gls)
1967–1972	Falkirk	92	(23)
1972–1977	Tranmere Rovers	172	(27)
1977–1979	Rotherham United	15	(1)
1979–????	Runcorn		
Total		279	(51)
- * Club domestic league appearances and goals

Thomas McIlwain Young (born 24 December 1947) is a Scottish former footballer, who played as midfielder for Falkirk, Tranmere Rovers, Rotherham United and Runcorn.
