= David Flusser =

Israeli academic (1917–2000)

- דוד פלוסר
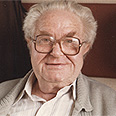
- David Flusser
- Born: 15 September 1917; Vienna, Austria-Hungary
- Died: 15 September 2000 (aged 83); Jerusalem, Israel
- Known for: Jerusalem School of Synoptic Research
- Title: Professor of Early Christianity and Judaism of the Second Temple Period at the Hebrew University of Jerusalem
- Spouse: Chana
- Children: 2 sons (Yochanan and Uri)
- Relatives: Vilém Flusser (cousin)

Academic background
- Education: Charles University in Prague; Hebrew University of Jerusalem (PhD, 1957)

Academic work
- Discipline: Biblical studies
- Institutions: Hebrew University of Jerusalem

David Flusser (Hebrew: דוד פלוסר; September 15, 1917 – September 15, 2000) was an Israeli professor of Early Christianity and Judaism of the Second Temple Period at the Hebrew University of Jerusalem.

== Biography ==
David Flusser was born in Vienna on 15 September 1917. He grew up in Příbram (Przibram, Pibrans, Freiberg i.B.), middle Bohemia, Czechoslovakia and attended the University of Prague. There he met a pastor, Josef Perl, who piqued his interest in Jesus and Christianity. As a young schoolboy his parents had sent him to a Christian school, but in Palestine during the late 1930s he became an observant Jew. Flusser emigrated to Mandatory Palestine, where he completed his doctorate at the Hebrew University of Jerusalem in 1957. He later taught in the Comparative Religions department for many years, mentoring many future scholars.

David Flusser was the cousin of Vilém Flusser.

Flusser died in Jerusalem on 15 September 2000, on his 83rd birthday. He was survived by his wife, Chana, 2 sons, Yochanan and Uri, and 7 grandchildren.

== Academic career ==
Flusser was a devout Orthodox Jew who applied his study of the Torah and Talmud to the study of ancient Greek, Roman and Arabic texts, as well as the Hebrew of the Dead Sea Scrolls. Flusser scrutinized the ancient Jewish and Christian texts for evidence of the Jewish roots of Christianity. While critically distinguishing the historical Jesus from the portrayal in the Gospels and other Christian writings, Flusser saw Jesus as an authentic Jew, misunderstood by his followers.

Jesus by David Flusser

David Satran, a professor of comparative religion at the Hebrew University of Jerusalem, said, "Dr. Flusser was rather remarkable in his strong insistence that not only was Jesus a Jew from birth to death, but that Jesus did nothing that could be interpreted as a revolt or questioning of the basic principles of the Judaism at the time." Personally, Flusser viewed Jesus as a tsadik with keen spiritual insight and a "high self-awareness" that near-contemporaries similarly expressed, such as Hillel the Elder in the Talmud and the "Teacher of Righteousness" in certain Dead Sea Scrolls.

Flusser pursued his research at a time when many Jews blamed Christianity for Nazism. During his trial in Israel, the Gestapo officer Adolf Eichmann refused to take an oath on the New Testament, insisting he would swear only "in the name of God." Flusser commented in an editorial in The Jerusalem Post: "I do not know who is the God in whose name Eichmann swore, but I am certain that it is neither the God of Israel nor the God of the Christian church. It should now become clear to the strongest Jewish opponents of Christianity that Christianity per se imposes limitations, and that the greatest crime against our people was not committed in the name of the Christian faith".

Flusser published over 1,000 articles in Hebrew, German, English, and other languages. The results of his many academic writings can be found in his book, Jesus (1965), whose augmented second edition The Sage from Galilee (1998) was updated to incorporate his later research and views on Jesus.

One of Flusser's views which was particularly influential in Germany, being taken up and advocated also by Joachim Jeremias, was the suggestion that the name Yeshu used of Jesus in the Talmud was "in no way abusive" but was in fact a Galilean dialect version, since according to Flusser, Galileans found the final ayin of the name Yeshua difficult to pronounce. Flusser also took the view (1992) that the Birkat haMinim was originally in reference to Sadducees, not Judaeo-Christians.

Flusser was trained as a philologist, and thus the study of Greek, Latin, Hebrew, and Aramaic manuscripts was central to his research interests. He was primarily interested in the medieval Book of Yosippon, which claimed much of his time from 1940 to 1982 when he finished his edition of this medieval history of the Second Temple period. His studies of the Dead Sea Scrolls and the New Testament manuscripts illuminated both the contemporary period and the echoes in the Book of Yosippon. Flusser once quipped that he would like to chat with Jesus and the anonymous author of the Book of Yosippon once he reached the "academy on high". His final biography would emphasize his medieval training and interests.

== Awards and recognition ==
Flusser was a member of the Israel Academy of Sciences and Humanities and received the Israel Prize in 1980, for his contributions to the study of Jewish history. Lawrence Schiffman, chairman of the Skirball department of Hebrew and Judaic studies at New York University, credited him with pioneering "the modern study of Christianity in the state of Israel in a scholarly context".

== Selected works ==
- Flusser, David; Lang, Justin; Pelikan, Jaroslav Jan (1986). Mary: Images of the Mother of Jesus in Jewish and Christian Perspective. Fortress Press. ISBN 978-0-800-60765-4. OCLC 12975323.
- ——— (1988). Judaism and the Origins of Christianity. Jerusalem: Magnes Press and the Hebrew University. ISBN 965-223-627-6.
- ——— (1987). Jewish Sources in Early Christianity. Adama Books. ISBN 978-0-9153-6192-2.
- ——— (1989). The Spiritual History of the Dead Sea Sect. Translated by Glucker, Carol. MOD Press.
- ——— (1998). Jesus (second ed. augmented ed.). Jerusalem: Magnes Press and the Hebrew University. ISBN 965-223-978-X.
- ———; Van De Sandt, Huub (2002). Jewish Traditions in Early Christian Literature, Volume 5 the Didache: Its Jewish Sources and Its Place in Early Judaism and Christianity. Compendia Rerum Iudaicarum Ad Novum Testamentum. Leiden: Brill. ISBN 978-9-0232-3763-1. OCLC 50229418.
- ———; Notley, R. Steven (2007). The Sage from Galilee: Rediscovering Jesus' Genius (Revised and updated ed.). Grand Rapids: Eerdmans. ISBN 978-0-8028-2587-2.
- ——— (2007). Judaism of the Second Temple Period: Qumran and Apocalypticism. Vol. 1. Translated by Azzan Yadin. Grand Rapids: Eerdmans. ISBN 978-0-8028-2469-1. (Note: Unfortunately, the translations made by Azzan Yadin are riddled with mistakes ranging from typographical errors to mistranslations to the omission of entire sentences, paragraphs, and (in one case) an entire page. These gross errors are deeply detrimental to the clarity and accuracy of Flusser's essays and reflect poorly on his scholarship. For a list of translation errors and other mistakes that have been noted in this translated collection of articles, see "Corrections and Emendations to Flusser's Judaism of the Second Temple Period". Jerusalem Perspective. 6 December 2016.)
- ——— (2009). Judaism of the Second Temple Period: The Jewish Sages and Their Literature. Vol. 2. Translated by Azzan Yadin. Grand Rapids: Eerdmans. ISBN 978-0-8028-2458-5.
- ——— (2013). Jesus ... The Crucified One and the Jews. Varda Books. - e-book only

== See also ==
- Jerusalem school hypothesis
- Jerusalem School of Synoptic Research
- List of Israel Prize recipients
