= Jacob Young (disambiguation) =

Jacob Young (born 1979) is an American singer and actor, most notable for his role in the now-defunct soap opera All My Children.

Jacob Young may also refer to:

- Jacob Young (documentarian) (born 1952), American documentarian
- Jacob Young (musician) (born 1970), Norwegian musician
- Jacob Young (politician) (born 1993), English Conservative MP
- Jacob Young (basketball) (born 1997), American basketball player
- Jacob Young (soccer) (born 2000), Australian footballer
- Jacob Young (baseball) (born 1999), American baseball player
- Jake Young (American football) (Jacob Cardwell Young III; 1968–2002), American football player

== See also ==
- Jacob Jung (1857–1931), politician
