= Sammy Younge Jr. =

American activist (1944–1966)

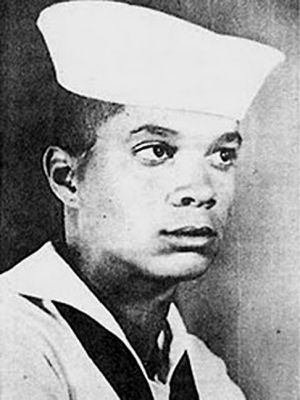
- Official image of Sammy Younge Jr. as an enlisted member in the United States Navy.
- Born: Samuel Leamon Younge Jr. November 17, 1944; Tuskegee, Alabama, U.S.
- Died: January 3, 1966 (aged 21); Tuskegee, Alabama, U.S.
- Cause of death: Gunshot wound
- Known for: Civil rights activist; first black college student activist murdered during the Civil Rights Movement

Samuel Leamon Younge Jr. (November 17, 1944 – January 3, 1966) was a civil rights and voting rights activist who was murdered for trying to desegregate a "whites only" restroom. Younge was an enlisted service member in the United States Navy, where he served for two years before being medically discharged. Younge was an active member of the Student Nonviolent Coordinating Committee (SNCC) and a leader of the Tuskegee Institute Advancement League.

Younge was the first African-American university student to be murdered in the United States due to his actions in support of the Civil Rights Movement. Three days after his death, SNCC became the first civil rights organization in the United States of America to oppose the Vietnam War, partly on the grounds that like Younge, innocent civilians should not face deadly violence.

== Early life ==
Samuel Leamon Younge Jr. was born on November 17, 1944, in Tuskegee, Alabama. His father, Samuel Younge Sr., was an occupational therapist, and his mother was a local schoolteacher. From the age of 12 to 14, from 1956 to 1958, Younge attended Cornwall Academy, in Massachusetts. He graduated from Tuskegee Institute High School in 1962, after which he joined the United States Navy. Younge served in the United States Navy from 1962 until July 1964, when he was given a medical discharge as a result of having to have one of his kidneys removed. Upon his discharge from the Navy, Younge began attending the Tuskegee Institute, in 1965, as a political science student.

== Civil rights activism ==
Younge became involved in the Civil Rights Movement during his first semester at the Tuskegee Institute. He participated in the Selma to Montgomery protest march in Montgomery, Alabama, against the "Bloody Sunday" incident in March 1965. Younge joined the SNCC and the Tuskegee Institute for Advancement League (TIAL) — a local civil rights student group formed with the help of the SNCC. He soon started helping to lead protests by the organizations against civil rights infractions in Alabama. Then, in April 1965, he went to Mississippi and worked with Unita Blackwell and Fannie Lou Hamer to help the Mississippi Freedom Democratic Party get black voters registered. In the Summer of 1965, Younge lead Tuskegee Institute students in challenging overt discrimination in Tuskegee. The group attempted to enter white restaurants, held rallies, and picketed establishments that refused to hire black people. Several times they attempted to attend segregated white churches and were brutally beaten twice. In September 1965, Younge was arrested and jailed after attempting to drive a group of African-Americans to get registered to vote in Lee County, Alabama.

Younge continued his efforts to get blacks registered to vote in Macon County, Alabama four months after being released from jail, up until his death.

== Murder and aftermath ==
Younge was shot in the face (under the left eye) by Marvin Segrest, a 68-year-old white gas station attendant at a Standard Oil station in Tuskegee, Alabama, on January 3, 1966. The shooting came after a verbal altercation between Younge and the attendant about Younge allegedly attempting to use a "whites-only" bathroom. Younge had retrieved a golf club from a vehicle and was holding it when he was shot.

Younge became the first black college student to be murdered for his actions in support of the Civil Rights Movement. Samuel Younge Sr. said of his son's death, "This is an era of social revolution. In such revolutions, individuals sacrifice their lives."

A justice department report from 2011 contests this version of events. The report claims that Younge had been belligerent with Segrest several times previously, including one incident where he tried to avoid paying the correct price for gas, and another where he physically threatened Segrest for not having the correct type of gas. On the day of the shooting, Younge was drunk and demanded to use a restroom inside the gas station that may have been an employees-only restroom. When Segrest refused, Younge first asked a friend for a gun, and then when one was not forthcoming, began taunting Segrest, at one point grabbing a golf club. Segrest then shot Younge as he was running down an alley several meters away.

== Trial ==
On January 4, 1966, Segrest was arrested, but released on $20,000 bond (a little over $200,000 in 2025). He was indicted for murder in the second degree and tried on December 7. The trial was moved from Macon County, where blacks outnumbered whites by a 2–1 margin, to Lee County. He was found not guilty by an all-white jury the next day. His acquittal sparked outraged protests in Tuskegee.

== Tributes ==
In January 1966, a protest of Younge's murder was staged in front of the White House by Leslie Bayless, with a coffin with a picture of Younge attached to it. Police forcibly removed the casket and arrested Bayless for disorderly conduct.

=== SNCC reaction ===
After Younge's death, the SNCC decided to publicly join the opposition to United States involvement in the Vietnam War. A statement on January 6, 1966, wrote that:

The Student Nonviolent Coordinating Committee has a right and a responsibility to dissent with United States foreign policy on any issue when it sees fit. The Student Nonviolent Coordinating Committee now states its opposition to United States' involvement in Vietnam on these grounds: We believe the United States government has been deceptive in its claims of concern for the freedom of the Vietnamese people, just as the government has been deceptive in claiming concern for the freedom of colored people in such other countries as the Dominican Republic, the Congo, South Africa, Rhodesia, and in the United States itself. ... The murder of Samuel [Younge] in Tuskegee, Alabama, is no different than the murder of peasants in Vietnam, for both [Younge] and the Vietnamese sought, and are seeking, to secure the rights guaranteed them by law. In each case the United States government bears a great part of the responsibility for these deaths. Samuel [Younge] was murdered because United States law is not being enforced. Vietnamese are murdered because the United States is pursuing an aggressive policy in violation of international law. — Press release: The Student Nonviolent Coordinating Committee

== See also ==
- Medger Evers
- James Chaney
