= Robert Young =

Robert, Rob, Robbie, Bob, or Bobby Young may refer to:

== Academics ==
- R. A. Young (Robert Arthur Young, 1871–1959), British physician
- Robert J. C. Young (born 1950), British cultural critic and historian
- Robert J. Young (born 1942), Canadian historian
- Robert M. Young (academic) (1935–2019), American science historian and psychoanalyst
- Robert W. Young (1912–2007), American linguist
- Robert Young (materials scientist) (born 1948), British materials scientist
- Robert S. Young, American professor of coastal geology
- R. V. Young (born 1947), professor of English at North Carolina State University
- Robert Burns Young (1874–1949), Scottish geologist at Witwatersrand University

== Entertainment ==
=== Film and television ===
- Robert "Benny" Young, Scottish film, television and stage actor
- Bob Young (news anchor) (1923–2011), American host of ABC Evening News
- Bob Young (TV producer), American television writer and producer
- Robert F. Young (1915–1986), American science fiction writer
- Robert M. Young (director) (1924–2024), American director, writer, and producer
- Robert O. Young (born 1952), American author of books about alternative medicine
- Robert Young (actor) (1907–1998), American actor
- Robert Young (director) (born 1933), British film and television director
- Robert Young, pen name of British writer Robert Payne (1911–1984)
- Rob Young (playwright), British playwright and screenwriter

=== Music and radio ===
- Bob Young (musician) (born 1945), English musician and author
- Red Top Young (1936–2021), American musician
- Robert Young (musician) (1964–2014), lead guitarist with Primal Scream
- Rob Young (writer, born 1968), author of the 2011 book about British folk music Electric Eden
- Rob Young (broadcaster), British broadcaster
- Rob Young (sound engineer), Canadian sound engineer

== Military ==
- Robert Benjamin Young (1773–1846), British sea captain at the Battle of Trafalgar
- Robert H. Young (1929–1950), U.S. Army soldier, Medal of Honor recipient
- Robert Nicholas Young (1900–1964), Lieutenant General in the United States Army
- Robert Young (New Zealand Army officer) (1877–1953), New Zealand military officer

== Politics ==
- Robert P. Young Jr. (born 1951), former Michigan Supreme Court Justice and 2018 candidate for U.S. Senate
- Robert Young (Canadian politician) (1834–1904), Canadian politician and businessman
- Robert Young (Hawaii chief) (1796–1813), Hawaiian chief
- Robert Young (Islington North MP) (1891–1985), British Member of Parliament for Islington North
- Robert Young (trade unionist) (1872–1957), British Member of Parliament for Newton
- Robert A. Young (1923–2007), member of the U.S. House of Representatives from Missouri
- Robert R. Young (politician), member of the Wisconsin State Assembly
- Rob Young (diplomat) (born 1945), British diplomat
- Bob Young (mayor) (born 1948), mayor of Augusta, Georgia and news anchor
- Robert D. Young (politician) (1934–2013), Michigan politician
- Bob Young (Ohio politician) (born 1982), Ohio state representative

== Religion ==
- Robert A. Young (minister) (1824–1902), American Methodist minister
- Robert D. Young (LDS Church leader) (1867–1962), leader in The Church of Jesus Christ of Latter-day Saints
- Robert Newton Young (born 1829), President of the Methodist Conference in 1886
- Robert Young (biblical scholar) (1822–1888), Scottish publisher, author of Young's Literal Translation of the Bible
- Robert Young (clergyman) (1796–1865), President of the Methodist Conference in 1856
- Robert Young (priest) (died 1716), Canon of Windsor

== Sports ==
=== American football ===
- Bob Young (American football coach) (1939–2023), American college football player and coach
- Bob Young (offensive lineman) (1942–1995), American NFL football player
- Robert Young (American football) (born 1969), American NFL football player

=== Association football (soccer) ===
- Robert Young (footballer) (1886–1955), Scottish footballer
- Bob Young (Scottish footballer) (1886–1970), Scottish footballer
- Bob Young (footballer, born 1886) Scottish footballer
- Bob Young (footballer, born 1894) (1894–1960), English association football manager

=== Other sports ===
- Robert Bruce Young (1858–1927), Scottish rugby union player
- Robert Young (sprinter) (1916–2011), American track athlete
- Bobby Young (1925–1985), American baseball player
- Bob Young (cricketer) (1933–2014), Scottish cricketer
- Robert Young (rugby union) (born 1940), Scottish rugby union player
- Bobby Young (curler) (fl. 1959–1962), Scottish curler
- Bobby Joe Young (born 1959), American boxer
- Robert W. Young (martial arts) (born 1960s), American martial artist, executive editor of Black Belt
- Robert Young (runner) (born 1982), British endurance runner
- Robbie Young (Australian footballer) (born 1995), Australian rules footballer

== Other ==
- Bob Young (businessman), Canadian founder and former CEO of Red Hat
- Robert Brewer Young (born 1967), cello, viola, and violin maker
- Robert Brown Young (1851–1914), Canadian-born architect in California
- Robert R. Young (1897–1958), American financier and industrialist
- Robert Vaughn Young (1938–2003), American critic of Scientology
- Robert Young (architect) (1822–1917), Irish architect on List of Privy Counsellors of Ireland
- Robert Young (forger) (1657–1700), English forger and cheat
- Robert Young (sternwheeler), ship

== See also ==
- Robert De Young, member of the Florida House of Representatives
- Bert Young (disambiguation)
- Young (surname)
