= Kansas City Missouri Temple =

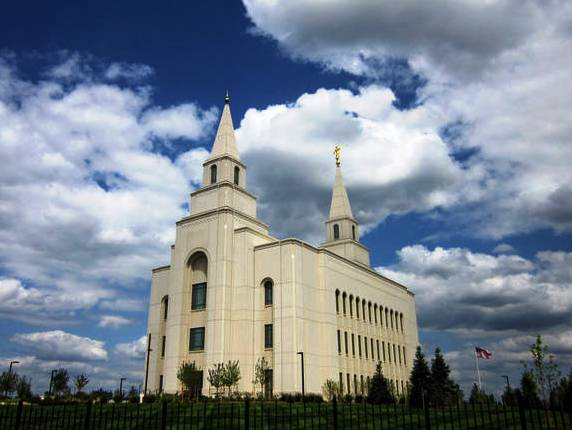
- Temple in June 2012
- Interactive map of Kansas City Missouri Temple
- Number: 137
- Dedication: May 6, 2012, by Thomas S. Monson
- Site: 8.05 acres (3.26 ha)
- Floor area: 32,000 ft^{2} (3,000 m^{2})
- Height: 150 ft (46 m)
- Official website • News & images

Church chronology
← Quetzaltenango Guatemala Temple	Kansas City Missouri Temple	→ Manaus Brazil Temple

Additional information
- Announced: October 4, 2008, by Thomas S. Monson
- Groundbreaking: May 8, 2010, by Ronald A. Rasband
- Open house: April 7–28, 2012
- Current president: Creed R. Jones
- Location: Kansas City, Missouri, United States
- Coordinates: 39°13′12.96″N 94°30′3.15″W
- Exterior finish: Precast concrete
- Baptistries: 1
- Ordinance rooms: 2 (two-stage progressive)
- Sealing rooms: 3
- Clothing rental: Yes
- Notes: Announced at the 178th Semiannual General Conference. Ground was broken May 8, 2010 by Ronald A. Rasband during an invitation-only ceremony. An open house was held from April 7 to 28, 2012, with the dedication held on May 6, 2012.

The Kansas City Missouri Temple is the 137th operating temple of the Church of Jesus Christ of Latter-day Saints (LDS Church). The intent to build the temple was announced on October 4, 2008, by church president Thomas S. Monson during general conference. A groundbreaking ceremony, to signify beginning of construction, was held on May 8, 2010, conducted by Ronald A. Rasband. It is the first to be built in the Kansas City metropolitan area, and the second in Missouri, after the St. Louis Missouri Temple. The temple is 32,000 square feet (3,000 m^{2}) and is on an 8.05 acres (3.26 ha) site.

It has a two-spire design, similar to temples in Logan, Manti, Rome, and Philadelphia. This temple was designed by FFKR Architects and uses an olive branch motif, along with art glass.

Previously in church history, attempts were made to build temples at Independence (1833) and Far West (1838). Joseph Smith, founder of the Latter Day Saint movement, selected and dedicated these locations, but construction did not proceed as church members left the area due to persecution. In 1994, Community of Christ, whose also traces its origins to the movement founded by Smith, completed a temple in Independence.

The temple is near other LDS Church historic sites; five miles away from Liberty Jail, where Joseph and Hyrum Smith were incarcerated in 1838, less than ten miles from Jackson county and Independence, and an hour's drive from Adam-ondi-Ahman, which church members believe is the place Adam and Eve lived after their expulsion from the Garden of Eden.

== History ==
The intent to construct the temple was announced on October 4, 2008, during general conference by church president Thomas S. Monson. When announced, Monson did not specify whether the temple would be constructed in Kansas or Missouri. A press release later confirmed the temple would be built in the Shoal Creek development in Clay County, Missouri, in the Kansas City boundaries. The Kansas City Missouri Temple was announced concurrently with the Philadelphia Pennsylvania, Calgary Alberta, Córdoba Argentina, and Rome Italy temples.

On October 22, 2009, the Kansas City Council approved The Meadows at Searcy Creek First Plat, the subdivision of the Shoal Creek development where the temple is located. The land used by the church includes a meetinghouse and the temple. In 2009, JE Dunn Construction was selected to build a temple. Site work in the development, including acquiring property for the future temple, commenced in late October. A groundbreaking for the temple occurred on May 8, 2010, with attendance by invitation only.

Following completion of construction, a public open house was held from April 7–28, 2012. Among the visitors were the governors of Missouri, Jay Nixon, and Kansas, Sam Brownback, whom were given a private tour on April 5, 2012. Both governors presented proclamations to the church, congratulating them on the completion of the temple. Over 92,000 people toured the temple during the open house, including those from 47 states and 11 countries.

On May 5, 2012, church members ages 12 to 18 from the new temple district did a cultural performance at the Kansas City Municipal Auditorium to celebrate the temple's completion. The following day, May 6, 2012, the temple was dedicated by Thomas S. Monson. At the time of its dedication, the temple served 45,000 church members in 126 congregations in parts of Kansas, Missouri, Oklahoma, and Arkansas.

== Gallery ==
Temple Exterior

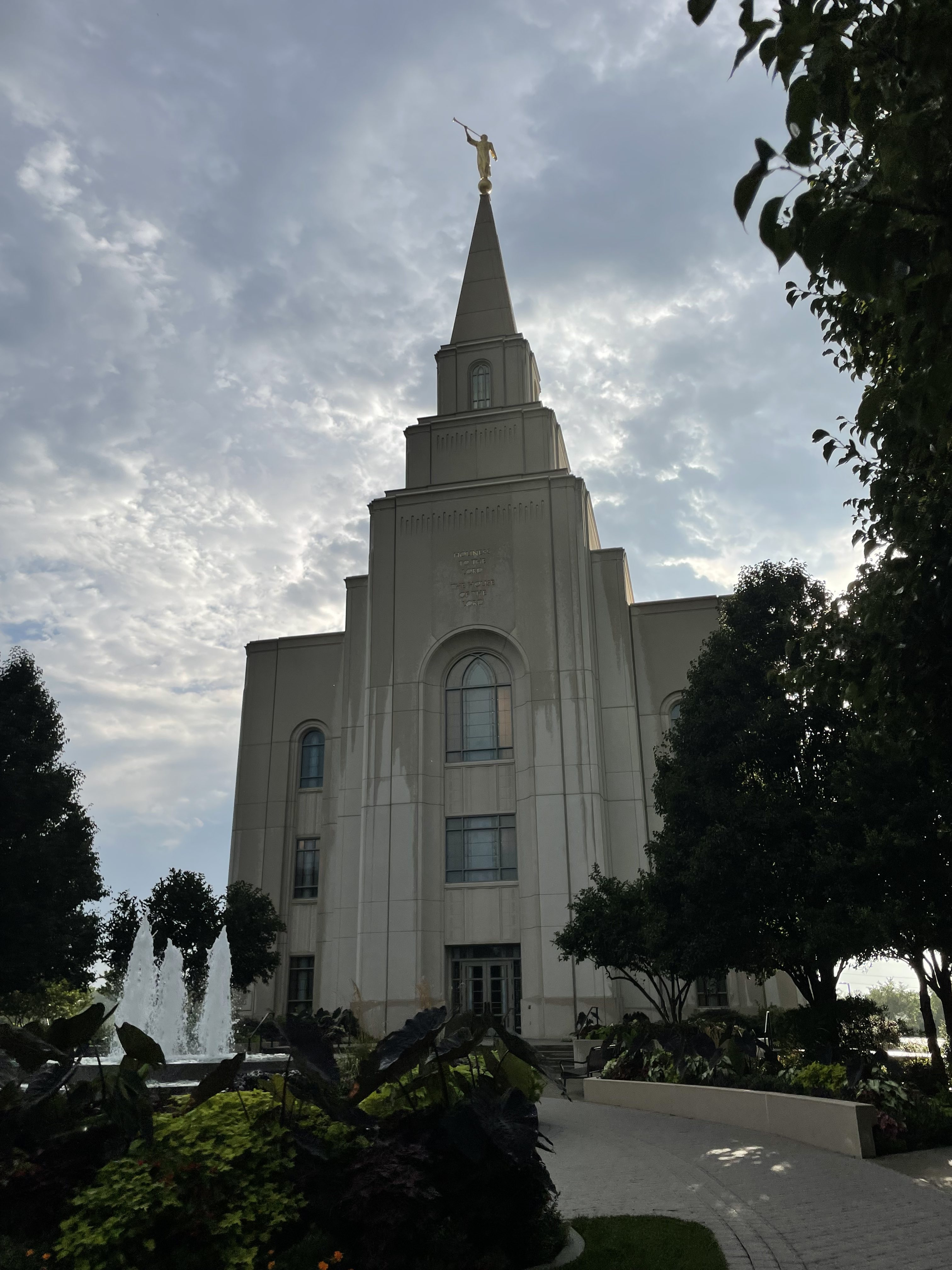
August 3, 2023

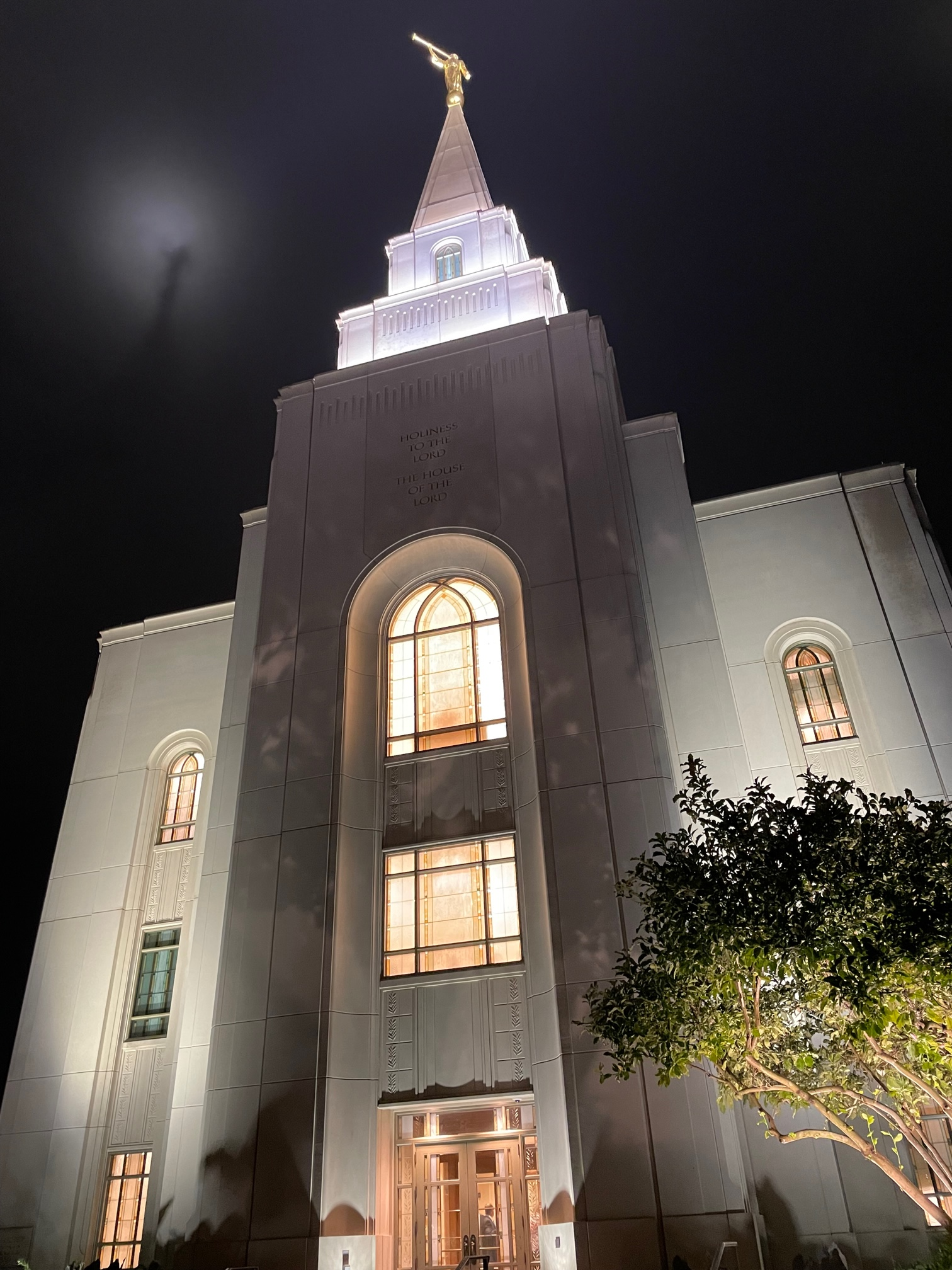
August 3, 2023

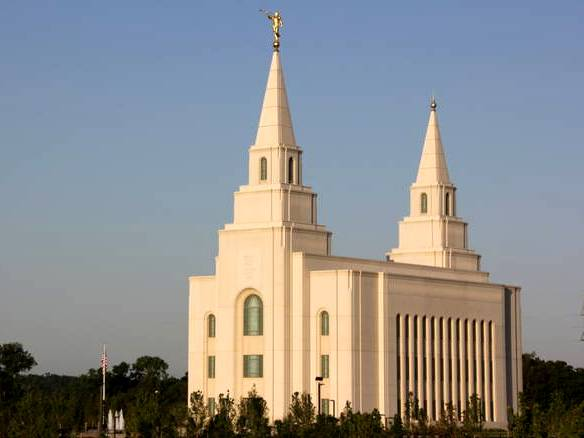
May 15, 2012

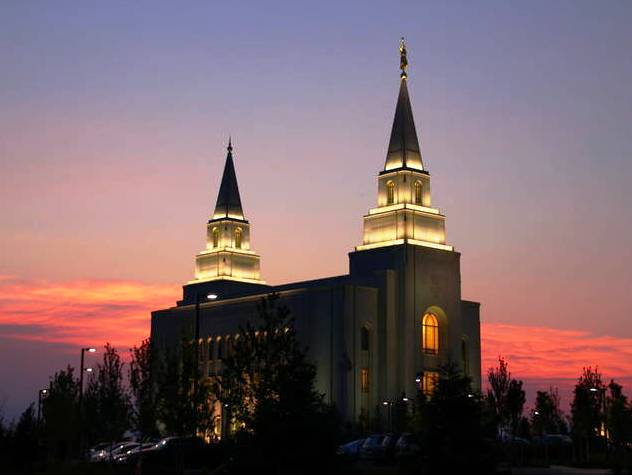
Nighttime photo of temple
May 25, 2012
Temple Construction

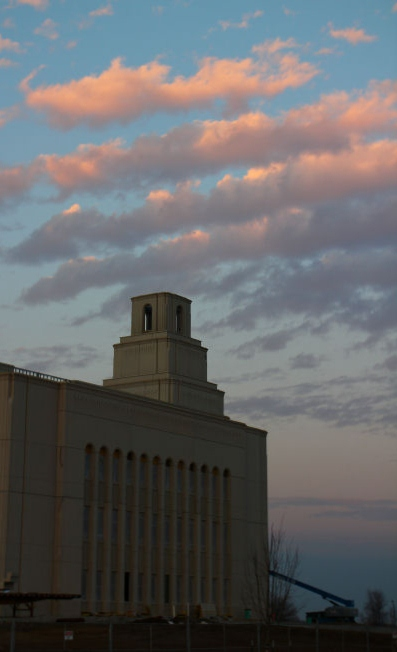
February 22, 2011

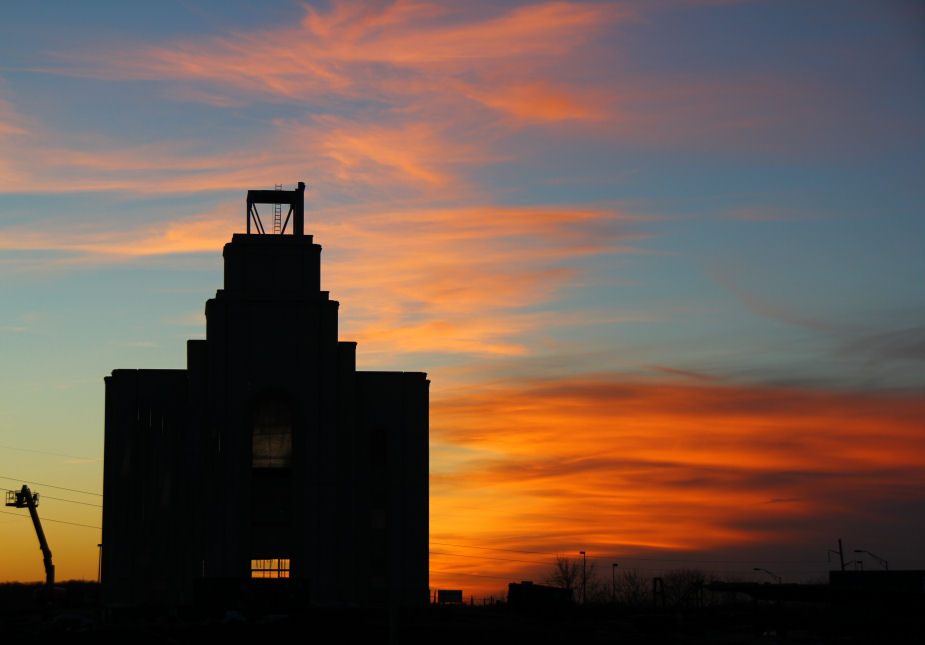
March 5, 2011

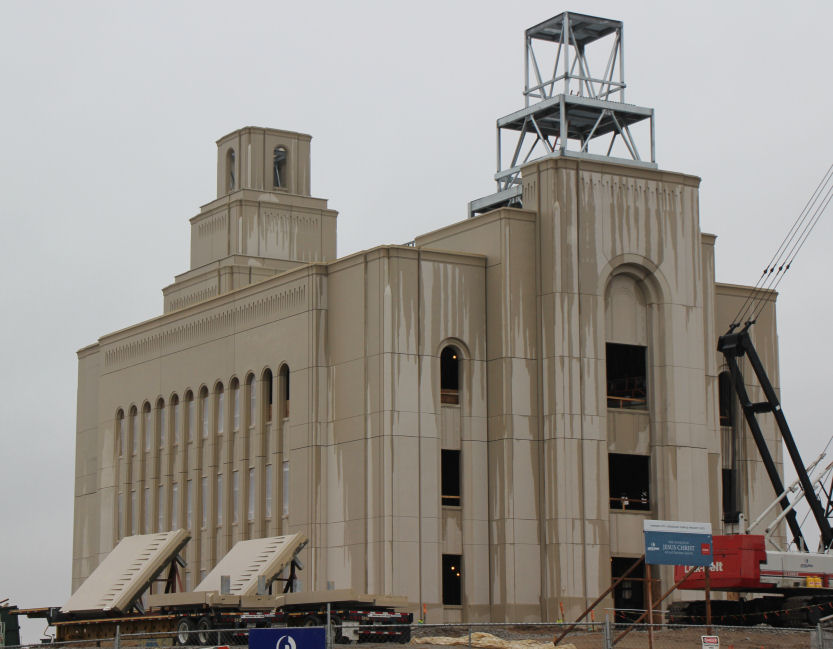
March 9, 2011

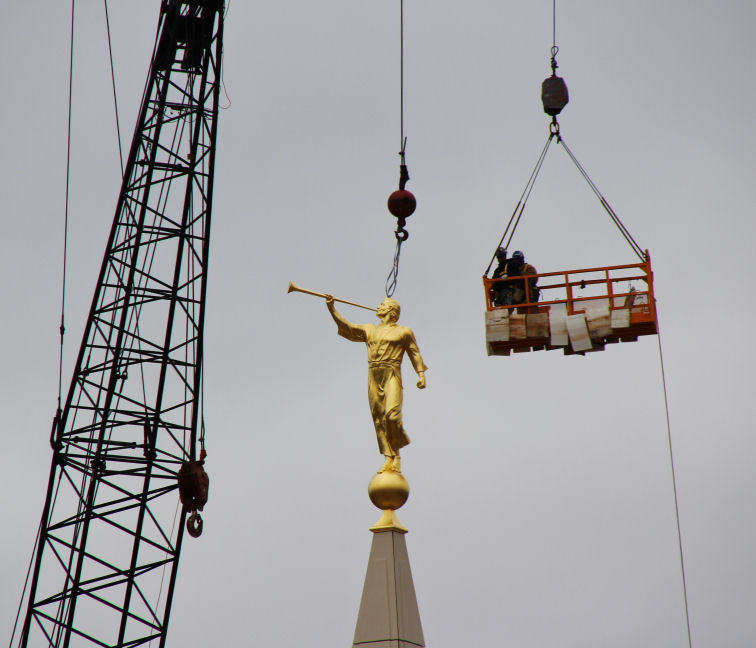
Installation of Angel Moroni statue
March 24, 2011

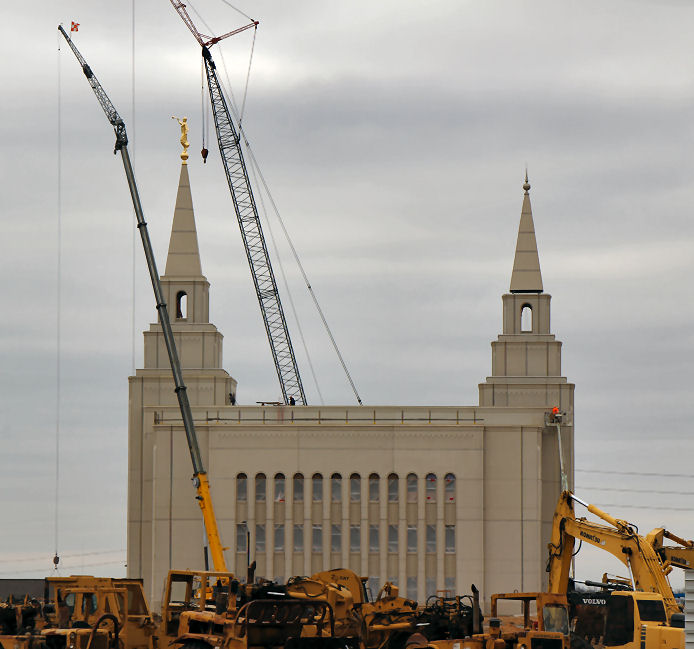
Just after installation of the statue
March 24, 2011

== See also ==
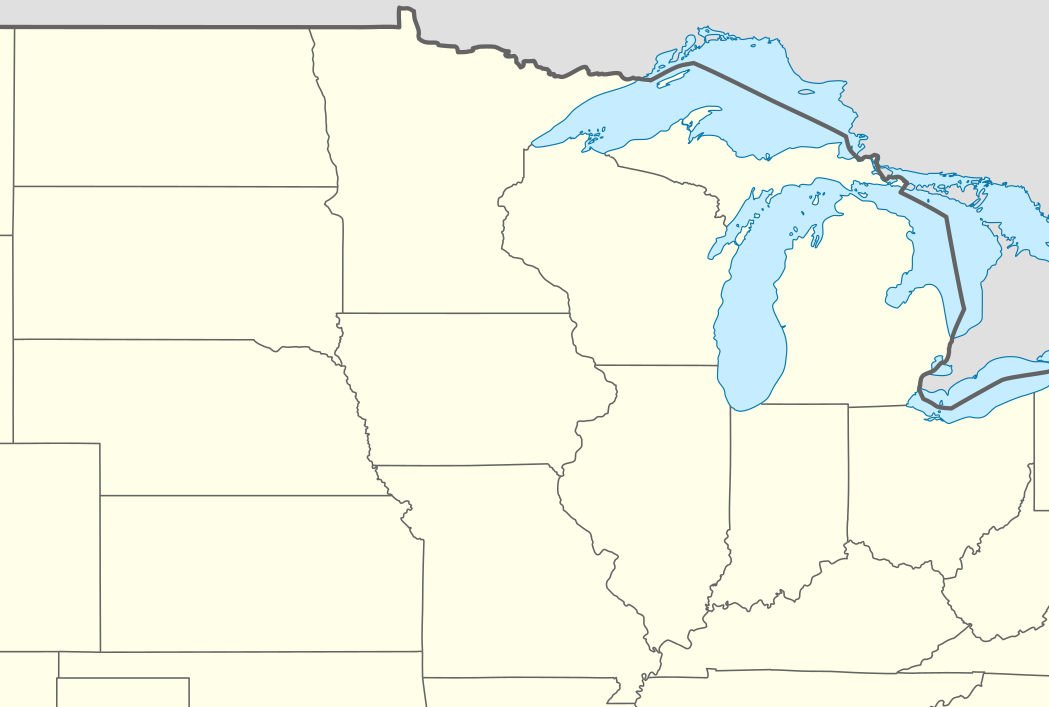
Temples in the United States Midwest
- = Operating
- = Under construction
- = Announced
- = Closed for renovation
- Comparison of temples (LDS Church)
- List of temples (LDS Church)
- List of temples by geographic region (LDS Church)
- Temple architecture (LDS Church)
- The Church of Jesus Christ of Latter-day Saints in Missouri
- The Church of Jesus Christ of Latter-day Saints in Kansas
