= Nespelem =

Nespelem may also refer to:

- Nespelem, Washington, a city in eastern Washington state
- Nespelem River, a tributary of the Columbia River
- Nespelem people, a Native American tribe in Eastern Washington
- Nespelem (art), an art movement and colony located in the Nespelem, Washington area
- Nespelem, a stern-wheel steamboat later named the Robert Young.
