= Robert D. Young =

Robert D. Young may refer to:

- Robert D. Young (LDS Church leader) (1867–1962), leader in The Church of Jesus Christ of Latter-day Saints
- Robert D. Young (politician) (1934–2013), Michigan politician

== See also ==
- Robert De Young, member of the Florida House of Representatives
