= Pinegar =

Pinegar is a surname of German Swiss origin. Notable people with the surname include:

- Ed J. Pinegar (1935–2020), American author, educator and leader
