= Bert Young (disambiguation) =

Bert Young was an English footballer.

Bert Young may also refer to:

- Bert Young, husband of Caresse Crosby
- Bert Young (actor) in Nutty but Nice
- Burt Young (1940–2023), American actor

== See also ==
- Albert Young (disambiguation)
- Robert Young (disambiguation)
- Herbert Young (disambiguation)
- Hubert Young (disambiguation)
