= Manaus Brazil Temple =

LDS Church temple in Brazil

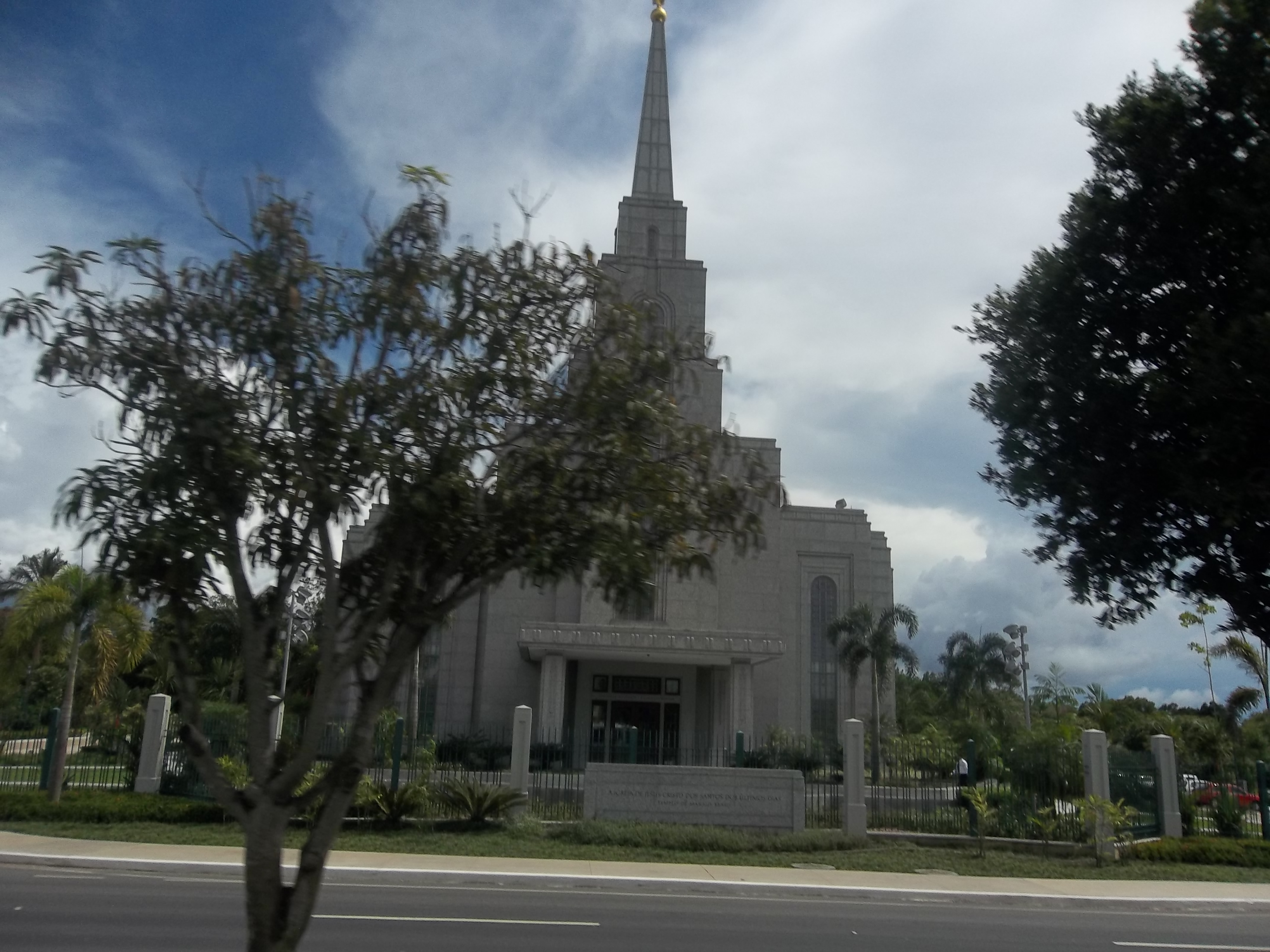
- Location of Temple
- Interactive map of Manaus Brazil Temple
- Number: 138
- Dedication: 10 June 2012, by Dieter F. Uchtdorf
- Site: 7.7 acres (3.1 ha)
- Floor area: 32,032 ft^{2} (2,975.9 m^{2})
- Height: 126 ft (38 m)
- Official website • News & images

Church chronology
← Kansas City Missouri Temple	Manaus Brazil Temple	→ Brigham City Utah Temple

Additional information
- Announced: 23 May 2007, by Gordon B. Hinckley
- Groundbreaking: 20 June 2008, by Charles A. Didier
- Open house: 18 May-2 June 2012
- Current president: Ivanilson Cavalcante
- Location: Manaus, Brazil
- Coordinates: 3°4′27.2964″S 60°5′21.56280″W
- Exterior finish: Branco Paris granite from Brazil
- Baptistries: 1
- Ordinance rooms: 2 (two-stage progressive)
- Sealing rooms: 2
- Notes: The temple will serve approximately 44,000 members.

The Manaus Brazil Temple is a temple of the Church of Jesus Christ of Latter-day Saints in Manaus, Amazonas, Brazil. The intent to construct it was announced on May 23, 2007, by the church's First Presidency. It became the sixth in Brazil, and the 138th operating temple worldwide. It was designed by GSBS Architects in collaboration with JCL Arquitetos, having a single spire with a gold-leafed angel Moroni on its top, and the exterior using locally sourced Branco Paris granite. It is on a 7.7-acre site near the Rio Negro and includes two ordinance rooms, two sealing rooms, and a baptistry.

A groundbreaking ceremony was held on June 20, 2008, led by Charles A. Didier, then president of the Brazil Area. Following completion of construction in 2012, over 42,000 visitors attended a public open house. The temple was dedicated on June 10, 2012, by Dieter F. Uchtdorf.

== History ==
The temple was announced in a letter from the church's First Presidency on May 23, 2007. The church announced it would be constructed on a multi-acre property along the Rio Negro in the Ponta Negra neighborhood of Manaus, The groundbreaking ceremony took place on June 20, 2008, marking the commencement of construction. The ceremony was presided over by Charles A. Didier, then president of the Brazil Area, and attended by local church members and community leaders.

During construction, a worker died from electrocution near the adjacent patron housing facility in June 2011, which temporarily paused construction. The angel Moroni statue on top of the temple's single spire was put in place on October 5, 2011, drawing interest from local members.

Following completion of the temple, the church announced the public open house that was held from May 18 to June 2, 2012, where approximately 42,000 people visited the temple.

The Manaus Brazil Temple was dedicated on June 10, 2012, by Dieter F. Uchtdorf, second counselor in the First Presidency. The dedication was done in three sessions and was attended by local members and church leaders, including Quentin L. Cook and William R. Walker.

It became the church's 138th operating temple and the sixth in Brazil, reducing travel time by up to 36 hours for members in northern Brazil.

In 2020, like all the church's others, the Manaus Brazil Temple was closed for a time in response to the COVID-19 pandemic.

== Design and architecture ==
The Manaus Brazil Temple was designed by GSBS Architects of Salt Lake City, in partnership with JCL Arquitetos Associados based in Olinda, Brazil. The temple is on a 7.7-acre property along the Rio Negro in the Ponta Negra district of Manaus. The landscaping includes various trees, including palm trees, on the temple grounds,

The temple has a spire, reaching a height of 126 feet, including the angel Moroni statue. The exterior uses Branco Paris granite, and has three tall, vertical art glass windows that rise above the front entrance.

The temple has two ordinance rooms, two sealing rooms, and a baptistry. Its interior is 32,032 square feet, with the design including Brazilian hardwoods, such as ipe and tauari, and locally sourced stone like Giallo Ornamental, Giallo Jasmine, and Azul Imperial granite, all accented by imported marble including Crema Marfil and Emperador Light. The color palette combines earth tones and blue hues, while Swarovski crystal chandeliers are also used. The temple has original murals and art.

== Temple presidents and admittance ==
=== Temple presidents ===
The church's temples are directed by a temple president and matron, each typically serving for a term of three years. The president and matron oversee the administration of temple operations and provide guidance and training for both temple patrons and staff.

Serving from 2012 to 2015, the first president was Ulisses P. Filho, Maria O. Ferreira Pereira serving as matron. As of 2024, Ivanilson Cavalcante is the president, with Francisca L. de Oliveira Cavalcante serving as matron.

=== Admittance ===
On May 18, 2012, the church announced the public open house that was held from May 18 to June 2. The temple was dedicated by Dieter F. Uchtdorf on June 10, 2012, in three sessions. Like all the church's temples, it is not used for Sunday worship services. To members of the church, temples are regarded as sacred houses of the Lord. Once dedicated, only church members with a current temple recommend can enter for worship.

== See also ==
- Comparison of temples of The Church of Jesus Christ of Latter-day Saints
- List of temples of The Church of Jesus Christ of Latter-day Saints
- List of temples of The Church of Jesus Christ of Latter-day Saints by geographic region
- Temple architecture (Latter-day Saints)
- The Church of Jesus Christ of Latter-day Saints in Brazil
