= Herbert Young =

Herbert Young may refer to:

- Herbert J. Young, athlete
- Herbert Young (politician), see List of foreign ministers in 1994

== See also ==
- Bert Young (disambiguation)
