= John Young (footballer, born 1891) =

Scottish footballer (1891–1947)

Personal information
- Full name: John M. Young
- Date of birth: 1891
- Place of birth: Auchterarder, Perth and Kinross, Scotland
- Date of death: 20 November 1947 (aged 55–56)
- Position: Outside right

Senior career*
Years	Team	Apps	(Gls)
1906–1913	Queen's Park	0	(0)
1913–1914	Motherwell	8	(0)
1914–1916	Partick Thistle	7	(0)
- King's Park
- * Club domestic league appearances and goals

John M. Young MC (1891 – 20 November 1947) was a Scottish amateur footballer who played in the Scottish League for Motherwell and Partick Thistle as an outside right. He also played cricket for Clydesdale.

== Personal life ==
Young was the younger brother of footballer Bob Young. Young studied medicine at the University of Glasgow Medical School and graduated with a MB ChB in 1914. After the outbreak of the First World War in 1914, he enlisted in the Royal Army Medical Corps and became medical officer for the 15th Battalion of the Highland Light Infantry. In 1917, Young was awarded the Military Cross for "saving many lives by establishing a first aid post well forward in the support line and tending to the wounded while under fire" during the Battle of the Somme on 3 July 1916. At the time of the award, he was holding the rank of temporary major. Young was seriously wounded in February 1917 and had a leg amputated. In 1920, Young qualified as a Doctor of Public Health and became a fellow of the Royal Faculty of Physicians and Surgeons of Glasgow in 1926. He became a chief school medical officer for Glasgow, was a member of the Scottish Council for Research in Education and served as honorary secretary of the Association of School Medical Officers.

== Career statistics ==
Appearances and goals by club, season and competition
Club	Season	League			National Cup		Total	
Club	Season	Division	Apps	Goals	Apps	Goals	Apps	Goals
Motherwell	1913–14	Scottish First Division	8	0	2	1	10	1
Partick Thistle	1914–15	Scottish First Division	6	0	―		6	0
Partick Thistle	1915–16	Scottish First Division	1	0	―		1	0
Partick Thistle	Total		7	0	―		7	0
Career total			15	0	2	1	17	1

== Honours ==
Queen's Park Strollers

- Scottish Amateur Cup: 1911–12
