= The Church of Jesus Christ of Latter-day Saints in Missouri =

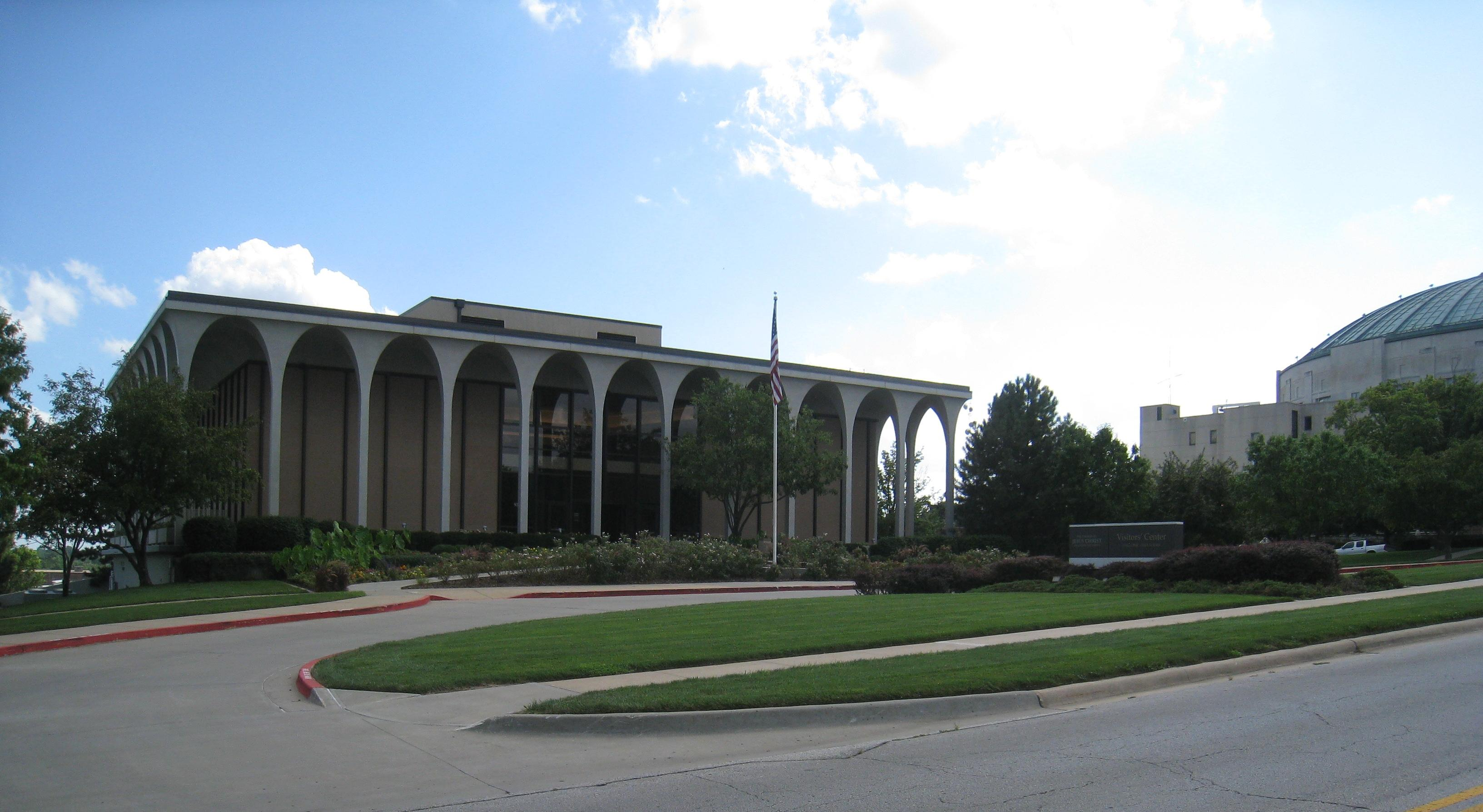
- Visitors center in Independence, Missouri
- Area: US Central
- Members: 84,311 (2025)
- Stakes: 22
- Wards: 153
- Branches: 28
- Total Congregations: 181
- Missions: 2
- Temples: 2 operating 1 announced 3 total
- FamilySearch Centers: 51

The Church of Jesus Christ of Latter-day Saints in Missouri refers to the Church of Jesus Christ of Latter-day Saints and its members in Missouri. The official church membership as a percentage of general population was 1.14% in 2014. According to the 2014 Pew Forum on Religion & Public Life survey, roughly 1% of Missourians self-identify themselves most closely with The Church of Jesus Christ of Latter-day Saints. The LDS Church is the 8th largest denomination in Missouri.

Stakes are located in Branson, Cape Girardeau, Columbia, Far West, Hazelwood, Independence, Joplin, Kansas City, Lake St Louis, Liberty, Monett, Platte City, St Louis (2), St Robert, Springfield (2), Warrensburg, and West Plains.

== History ==
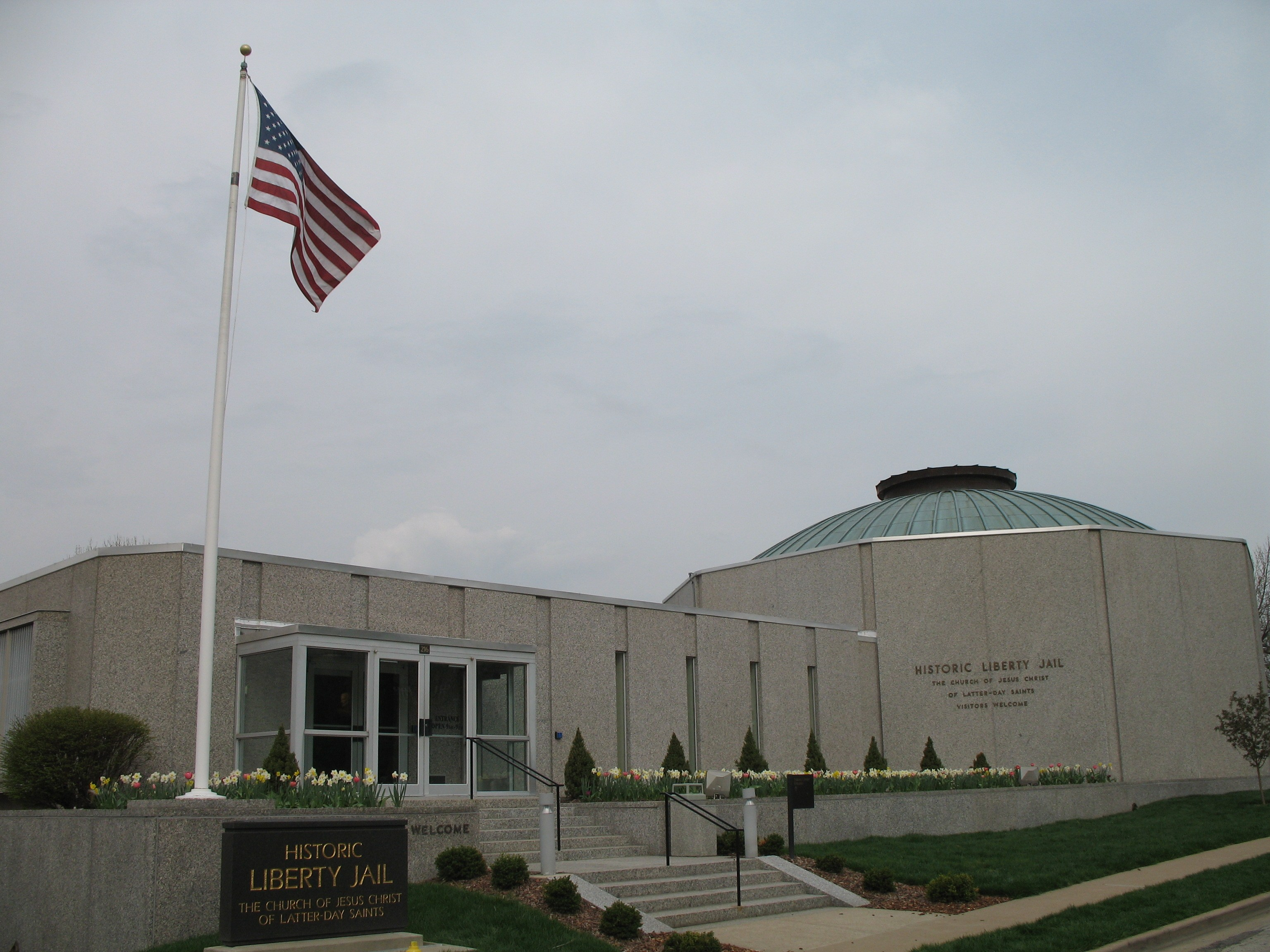
Historic Liberty Jail

Membership in Missouri
Year	Membership
1974	13,796
1980	25,243
1990	35,084
1999	51,187
2009	63,666
2019	72,525
2024	83,213
*Membership was published as a rounded number. Source: Wendall J. Ashton; Jim M. Wall, Deseret News, various years, Church Almanac State Information: Missouri

In 1831, Joseph Smith told LDS Church members that Independence, Missouri, was to be the gathering spot for the church.

There were many Mormons in Missouri and it served as one of the headquarters of the Church of Jesus Christ of Latter-day Saints in the 1830s. In 1838, Lilburn W. Boggs issued the Extermination Order to drive Mormons from the state, and for a time there was no organized Church presence here.

Later in the 1840s, members of the Church, both immigrants from Britain and migrants from Nauvoo, Illinois moved to St. Louis, Missouri and a branch was organized there in 1844. In 1852 the steamship Saluda exploded near Lexington, Missouri with many of those killed being Latter-day Saints headed towards Fremont, Nebraska to then outfit to go to Utah.

By 1849, there were over 3,000 Latter-day Saints in the St. Louis area, and in 1854, a stake was organized there with Milo Andrus as president. Among those baptized in Missouri about this time was Henry Eyring, a German immigrant who would later lead Latter-day Saint missionary efforts among the Cherokee in Oklahoma and many of whose descendants would be prominent later in the LDS Church. In 1858, the stake was dissolved and most of the Mormons migrated to Utah.

In the late 19th century, there was limited missionary presence. However, from 1904, a mission was headquartered in Independence. In 1911, a branch was organized there with Joseph F. Smith dedicating a chapel in 1914. Shortly after this Spencer W. Kimball, later president of the Church, served a mission in Missouri.

The church began to expand in the 1920s with five new chapels dedicated in 1926 and 1927. The first Missouri stake was organized in Kansas City in 1956 with another organized in St. Louis in 1958. Columbia, Missouri got a stake in 1970, the Independence Stake was split from the Kansas City stake in 1971 and a stake was organized in Springfield in 1973. The first LDS temple in Missouri was dedicated by Gordon B. Hinckley in the St. Louis area in 1997.

For much of the early 20th century, Liahona The Elders' Journal was published in Independence, Missouri this was the main LDS publication aimed at church members living in the United States outside of the Mormon corridor.

In 2010, the Kansas City Missouri Temple was dedicated—the temple stands not far from Liberty, Missouri where LDS Church founder Joseph Smith Jr. was incarcerated in the winter of 1838–39.

== Stakes ==
As of July 2026, Missouri was home to the following stakes:

Stake	Organized	Mission	Temple
Branson Missouri	27 Apr 2025	Arkansas Bentonville	Bentonville Arkansas
Cape Girardeau Missouri	20 Oct 1985	Missouri St Louis	St Louis Missouri
Chariton River Missouri	05 Nov 2023	Missouri St Louis	St Louis Missouri
Columbia Missouri	19 Apr 1970	Missouri St Louis	St Louis Missouri
Far West Missouri	18 Oct 2025	Missouri Independence	Kansas City Missouri
Grand River Missouri	27 Apr 2025	Missouri Independence	Kansas City Missouri
Hazelwood Missouri	04 Jun 2017	Missouri St Louis	St Louis Missouri
Independence Missouri	25 Mar 1971	Missouri Independence	Kansas City Missouri
Joplin Missouri	28 Aug 1977	Arkansas Bentonville	Bentonville Arkansas
Kansas City Missouri	21 Oct 1956	Missouri Kansas City	Kansas City Missouri
Lake St Louis Missouri	15 Mar 1987	Missouri St Louis	St Louis Missouri
Liberty Missouri	14 Oct 1979	Missouri Independence	Kansas City Missouri
Monett Missouri	26 Oct 2014	Arkansas Bentonville	Bentonville Arkansas
Platte City Missouri	09 Mar 1997	Missouri Independence	Kansas City Missouri
Shoal Creek Missouri	08 Jun 2025	Missouri Independence	Kansas City Missouri
Springfield Missouri	29 Apr 1973	Arkansas Bentonville	Bentonville Arkansas
Springfield Missouri South	21 May 1995	Arkansas Bentonville	Bentonville Arkansas
St Louis Missouri	4 Nov 1854	Missouri St Louis	St Louis Missouri
St Louis Missouri South	16 Mar 1980	Missouri St Louis	St Louis Missouri
St Robert Missouri	18 May 1997	Arkansas Bentonville	St Louis Missouri
Warrensburg Missouri	05 Dec 2004	Missouri Kansas City	Kansas City Missouri
West Plains Missouri	24 Nov 2013	Arkansas Bentonville	St Louis Missouri

== Missions ==
Mission	Organized
Missouri Independence Mission	4 April 1904
Missouri Kansas City Mission	1 July 2026
Missouri St Louis Mission	1 July 1977

== Temples ==
Temples in Missouri
- = Operating
- = Under construction
- = Announced
- = Temporarily Closed
- = Construction suspended

Missouri currently has two operating temples and three in which construction has been indefinitely suspended.

=== Operating ===
50. St. Louis Missouri Temple; Official website; News & images	
Location: Announced: Groundbreaking: Dedicated: Size: Style:	Town and Country, Missouri, United States; December 29, 1990 by Ezra Taft Benson; October 30, 1993 by Gordon B. Hinckley; June 1, 1997 by Gordon B. Hinckley; 58,749 sq ft (5,458.0 m^{2}) on a 14-acre (5.7 ha) site Classic modern, single-spire design - designed by Chiodini Associates
137. Kansas City Missouri Temple; Official website; News & images	
Location: Announced: Groundbreaking: Dedicated: Size: Notes:	Kansas City, Missouri, United States; October 4, 2008 by Thomas S. Monson; May 8, 2010 by Ronald A. Rasband; May 6, 2012 by Thomas S. Monson; 32,000 sq ft (3,000 m^{2}) on a 8.05-acre (3.26 ha) site Announced at the 178th Semiannual General Conference. Ground was broken May 8, 2010 by Ronald A. Rasband during an invitation-only ceremony. An open house was held from April 7 to 28, 2012, with the dedication held on May 6, 2012.
279. Springfield Missouri Temple (Under construction); Official website; News & images	
Location: Announced: Groundbreaking: Size:	Springfield, Missouri, United States; 2 April 2023 by Russell M. Nelson; 6 June 2026 by Aroldo B. Cavalcante; 29,000 sq ft (2,700 m^{2}) on a 38-acre (15 ha) site

=== Efforts Suspended ===
The following temples had been announced and in some stage of development, but whose construction is not actively being pursued at this time.

. Temple Lot (Efforts halted in 1830s); Official website	
Location: Announced: Groundbreaking: Notes:	Independence, Missouri, U.S. April 1829; August 1831 by Joseph Smith (land dedicated); Site Dedicated August 1, 1831 when cornerstones laid by Joseph Smith. The plat for the City of Zion (Independence, Missouri) originally called for 24 temples at the center of the city. A temple has never been built at this location because the temple's site, as designated by Joseph Smith, is occupied by a Latter Day Saint movement denomination known as the Church of Christ (Temple Lot).
. Far West Temple (Efforts halted in 1830s); News & images	
Location: Announced: Groundbreaking: Notes:	Far West, Caldwell County, Missouri, United States; April 16, 1838 by Joseph Smith; July 4, 1838 by Quorum of the Twelve on a 640-acre (260 ha) site Site Dedicated. Cornerstones laid and dedicated July 4, 1838. Efforts discontinued in 1800s. The cornerstones remain, covered in glass, as part of a memorial park at the site.
. Adam-ondi-Ahman Temple (Efforts halted in 1830s); News & images	
Location: Announced: Groundbreaking: Notes:	Adam-ondi-Ahman, Daviess County, Missouri, United States; April 26, 1838 by Joseph Smith; October 1838 by Joseph Smith on a 3,000-acre (1,200 ha) site Site dedicated. Laid out by Brigham Young (although no cornerstones were laid). Never built because of 1838 Mormon War. Design was to be similar to Kirtland Temple. Site dedicated and temple announced by Joseph Smith, Jr. on April 26, 1838.

== See also ==
- The Church of Jesus Christ of Latter-day Saints membership statistics (United States)
- Missouri: Religion
- Independence, Missouri
- LDS Visitors Center, Independence, Missouri
- Jackson County, Missouri
- Far West, Missouri
- Adam-ondi-Ahman
- Caldwell County, Missouri
- Daviess County, Missouri
- Mormon War (1838)
- Haun's Mill massacre
- Extermination order
- Liberty Jail
- Evening and Morning Star
- Joseph Smith
- Zion's Camp
