= Clyfford Still =

American painter (1904–1980)

- Born: Clyfford Elmer Still; November 30, 1904; Grandin, North Dakota, U.S.
- Died: June 23, 1980 (aged 75); Baltimore, Maryland, U.S.
- Resting place: Pipe Creek Church of the Brethren Cemetery, Union Bridge, Maryland
- Education: Spokane University, Washington State University
- Known for: Painting
- Movement: Abstract expressionism, Color Field painting
- Spouse(s): Lillian August Battan Still (c. 1930 – late 1940s); Patricia Alice Garske Still (1957–1980)

Clyfford Still (November 30, 1904 – June 23, 1980) was an American painter, and one of the leading figures in the first generation of abstract expressionists, who developed a new, powerful approach to painting in the years immediately following World War II, and is credited as one of the movement’s pioneers. His shift from representational to abstract painting occurred between 1938 and 1942, earlier than his colleagues like Jackson Pollock and Mark Rothko, who continued to paint in figurative-surrealist styles well into the 1940s.

== Biography ==
Still was born in 1904 in Grandin, North Dakota and spent his childhood in Spokane, Washington and Bow Island in southern Alberta, Canada. In 1925 he visited New York, briefly studying at the Art Students League. He attended Spokane University from 1926 to 1927 and returned in 1931 with a fellowship, graduating in 1933. That fall, he became a teaching fellow, then faculty member at Washington State College (now Washington State University), where he obtained his Master of Fine Arts degree in 1935 and taught until 1941. He spent the summers of 1934 and 1935 at the Trask Foundation (now Yaddo) in Saratoga Springs, New York.

In 1937, along with Washington State colleague Worth Griffin, Still co-founded the Nespelem Art Colony that produced hundreds of portraits and landscapes depicting Colville Indian Reservation Native American life over the course of four summers.

In 1941 Still relocated to the San Francisco Bay area where he worked in various war industries while pursuing painting. He had his first solo exhibition at the San Francisco Museum of Art (now San Francisco Museum of Modern Art) in 1943. He taught at the Richmond Professional Institute (RPI), now Virginia Commonwealth University, from 1943 to 1945, then went to New York City.

Mark Rothko, whom Still had met in California in 1943, introduced him to Peggy Guggenheim, who gave him a solo exhibition at her gallery, The Art of This Century Gallery, in early 1946. The following year Guggenheim closed her gallery and Still, along with Rothko and other Abstract Expressionists, joined the Betty Parsons gallery.

Still returned to San Francisco, where he became a highly influential professor at the California School of Fine Arts (now San Francisco Art Institute), teaching there from 1946 to 1950. He encouraged some of his students to open a gallery called Metart, which was short-lived but influential. In 1950, he moved to New York City, where he lived most of the decade during the height of Abstract Expressionism, but during his time in New York, he also became increasingly critical of the art world. In the early 1950s, Still severed ties with commercial galleries. In 1961 he moved to a 22-acre farm near Westminster, Maryland, removing himself further from the art world. Still used a barn on the property as a studio during the warm weather months. In 1966, Still and his second wife purchased a 4,300-square-foot house at 312 Church Street in New Windsor, Maryland, about eight miles from their farm, where he lived until his death.

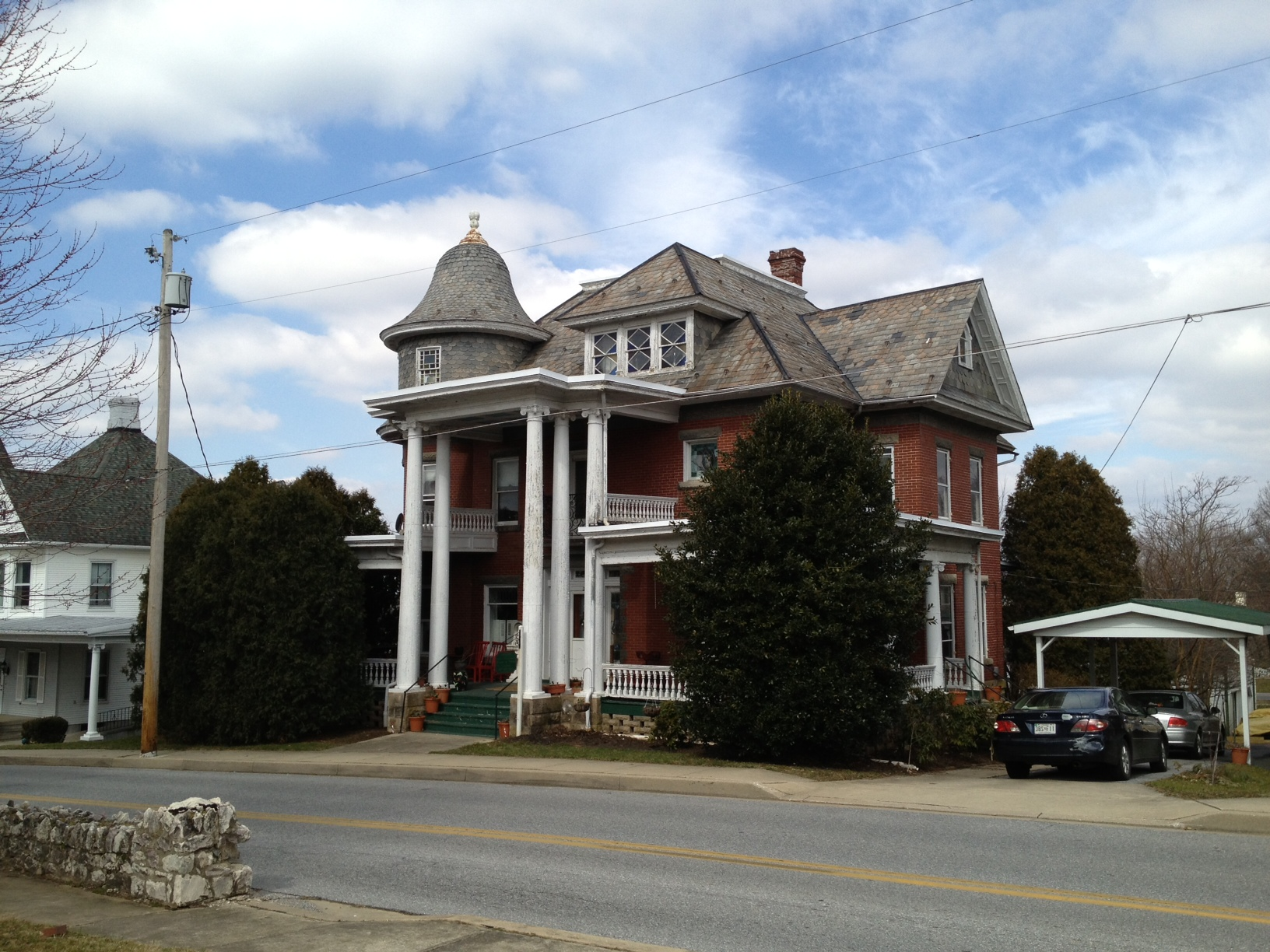
New Windsor, Maryland, home Clyfford Still shared with his wife Patricia from 1966 until his death in 1980

== Family life ==
Still married Lillian August Battan circa 1930. They had two daughters, born in 1939 and 1942. The couple separated in the late 1940s and divorced in 1954. In 1957, Still married Patricia Alice Garske, who had been one of his students at Washington State and was sixteen years his junior.

== Paintings ==
Clyfford Still, 1957-D No. 1, 1957, oil on canvas, 113 × 159 in, Albright–Knox Art Gallery, Buffalo, New York

Having developed his signature style in San Francisco between 1946 and 1950 while teaching at the California School of Fine Arts, Still is considered one of the foremost Color Field painters – his non-figurative paintings are non-objective, and largely concerned with juxtaposing different colors and surfaces in a variety of formations. Unlike Mark Rothko or Barnett Newman, who organized their colors in a relatively simple way (Rothko in the form of nebulous rectangles, Newman in thin lines on vast fields of color), Still's arrangements are less regular. In fact, he was one of the few painters who combined practices of Color Field paintings with that of Gestural, Action Paintings. His jagged flashes of color give the impression that one layer of color has been "torn" off the painting, revealing the colors underneath. Another point of departure with Newman and Rothko is the way the paint is laid on the canvas; while Rothko and Newman used fairly flat colors and relatively thin paint, Still uses a thick impasto, causing subtle variety and shades that shimmer across the painting surfaces. His large mature works recall natural forms and natural phenomena at their most intense and mysterious; ancient stalagmites, caverns, foliage, seen both in darkness and in light lend poetic richness and depth to his work. By 1947, he had begun working in the format that he would intensify and refine throughout the rest of his career – a large-scale color field applied with palette knives. Among Still's well-known paintings is 1957-D No. 1, 1957 (right), which is mainly black and yellow with patches of white and a small amount of red. These four colors, and variations on them (purples, dark blues) are predominant in his work, although there is a tendency for his paintings to use darker shades.

== Exhibitions ==
In 1943, Still's first solo show took place at the San Francisco Museum of Art. In 1947, Jermayne MacAgy, assistant director of the California Palace of the Legion of Honor, gave him a solo show there. The artist then declined all public exhibitions from 1952 to 1959. A first comprehensive Still retrospective took place at the Albright–Knox Art Gallery, Buffalo, New York, in 1959. Later solo exhibitions of Still's paintings were presented by the Institute of Contemporary Art of the University of Pennsylvania in Philadelphia in 1963 and at the Marlborough-Gerson gallery, New York, from 1969 to 1970. In 1975, a permanent installation of a group of his works opened at the San Francisco Museum of Modern Art. In 1979, New York's Metropolitan Museum of Art organized the largest survey of Still's art to date and the largest presentation afforded by this institution to the work of a living artist.

== Awards ==
Still received the Award of Merit for Painting in 1972 from the American Academy of Arts and Letters, of which he became a member in 1978, and the Skowhegan Medal for Painting in 1975.

== Estate and museum ==
Still wrote a will in 1978 that left a portion of his work, along with his archives, to his wife Patricia and stated: "I give and bequeath all the remaining works of art executed by me in my collection to an American city that will agree to build or assign and maintain permanent quarters exclusively for these works of art and assure their physical survival with the explicit requirement that none of these works of art will be sold, given, or exchanged but are to be retained in the place described above exclusively assigned to them in perpetuity for exhibition and study." After Still's death in 1980, the Still collection of approximately 2,400 works was sealed off completely from public and scholarly access for more than twenty years.

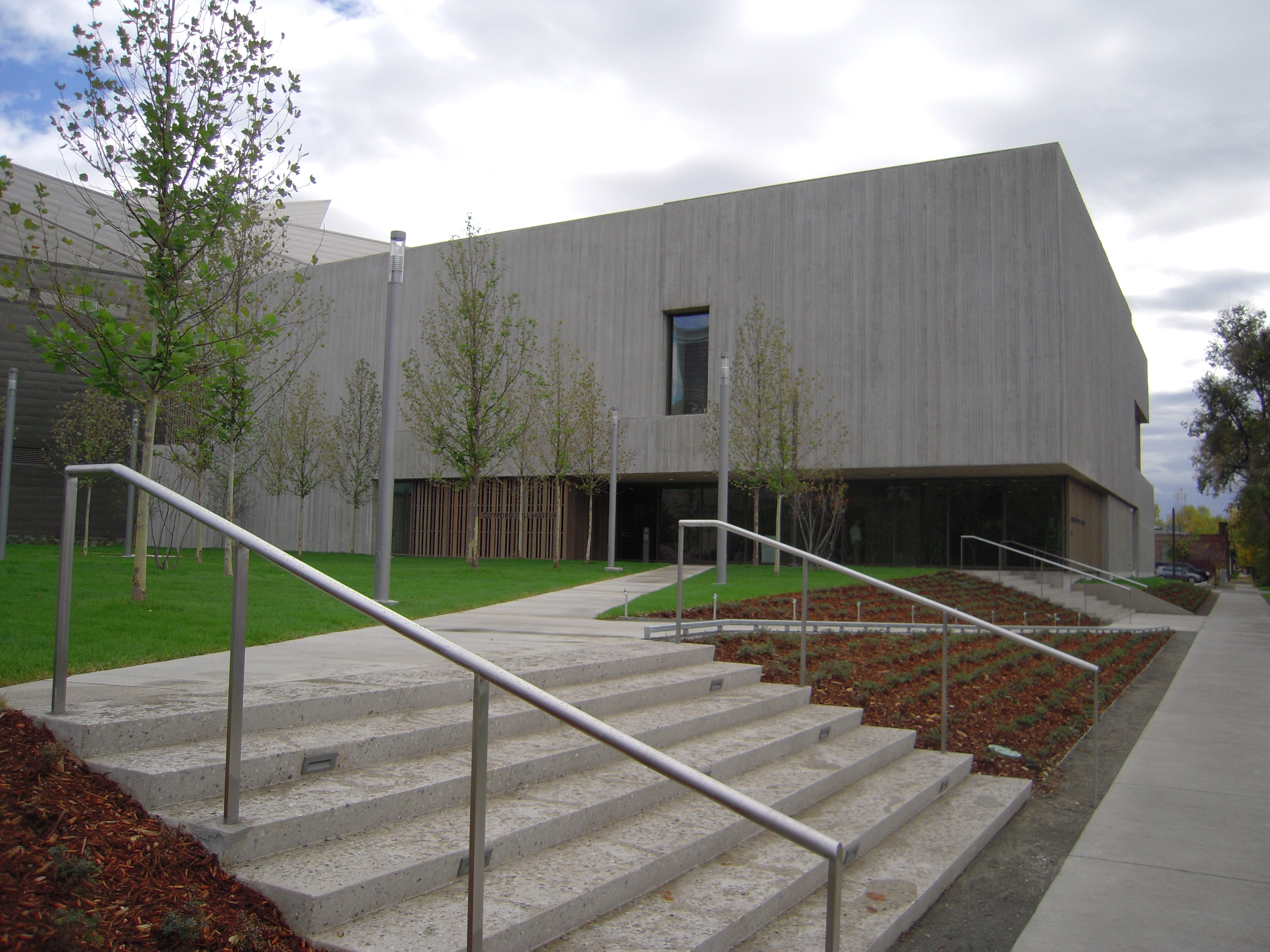
Clyfford Still Museum, Denver, Colorado

In August 2004, the City of Denver, Colorado announced it had been chosen by Patricia Still to receive the artworks contained within the Clyfford Still Estate (roughly 825 paintings on canvas and 1575 works on paper – drawings and limited-edition fine-art prints). The Clyfford Still Museum, an independent nonprofit organization, opened under the directorship of Dean Sobel in November 2011. The museum also houses the complete Still archives of sketchbooks, journals, notebooks, the artist's library, and other archival materials, inherited upon Patricia Still's death in 2005.

The building was designed by Allied Works Architecture, led by Brad Cloepfil. The museum is recognized as a successful implementation of contemporary architecture and an icon for the city of Denver. From January 24 to April 17, 2016, the Denver Art Museum hosted a temporary exhibit called "Case Work", which showcased the design process used for this museum and other major works by Allied and Cloepfil. After Denver, the exhibit was planned to show at the Portland Art Museum and then embark on a two-year international tour.

In March 2011, a Maryland court with jurisdiction over Patricia Still's estate ruled that four of Still's works could be sold before they officially became part of the museum's collection. In November 2011, Sotheby's in New York sold the four works; PH-351 (1940) for US$1.2 million, 1947-Y-No. 2 (1947) for US$31.4 million, 1949-A-No. 1 (1949) for US$61.7 million and PH-1033 (1976) for US$19.6 million. The proceeds from the sales, US$114 million, went to the Clyfford Still Museum "to support its endowment and collection-related expenses." In the decade prior to the sale, only 11 of Still's works came up at auction. The Clyfford Still Museum opened on November 18, 2011.

In December 2011, a visitor to the museum was accused of causing $10,000 worth of damage to Still's 1957-J no.2 oil painting.

In 2013, the Clyfford Still Museum Research Center was launched. Its aim is to explore the period of art and history in which the abstract painter worked. Plans include a fellowship program, cross-disciplinary scholarly publications, and research symposia.

== Other collections ==
- Buffalo AKG Art Museum, Buffalo, New York (33 paintings, 1937–1963)
- San Francisco Museum of Modern Art (30 paintings, ca. 1936–1974)
- Metropolitan Museum of Art, New York (12 paintings, 1943–1977)
- Hirshhorn Museum and Sculpture Garden, Washington, D.C. (8 paintings, ca. 1935–1962)
- Solomon R. Guggenheim Museum, New York
- The Phillips Collection, Washington, D.C.
- Whitney Museum of American Art, New York
- Tate collection, London (on loan to Middlesbrough Institute of Modern Art)
- Governor Nelson A. Rockefeller Empire State Plaza Art Collection, Albany, New York
- The Kreeger Museum, Washington, D.C.
- Glenstone, Potomac, Maryland
- Wadsworth Atheneum Museum of Art, Hartford, Connecticut

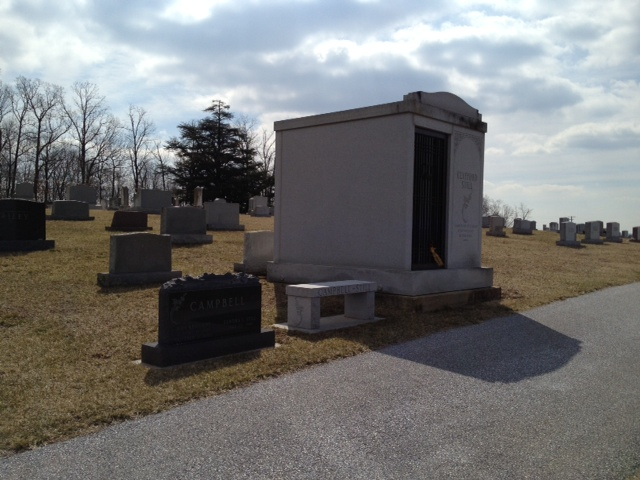
Clyfford Still Mausoleum at Pipe Creek Church of the Brethren Cemetery, Carroll County, Maryland

== Quotes ==
=== From Still ===
"I never wanted color to be color. I never wanted texture to be texture, or images to become shapes. I wanted them all to fuse together into a living spirit."

"It's intolerable to be stopped by a frame's edge."

"I am not interested in illustrating my time. A man's 'time' limits him, it does not truly liberate him. Our age – it is one of science, of mechanism, of power and death. I see no point in adding to its mechanism of power and death. I see no point in adding to its mammoth arrogance the compliment of a graphic homage."

"How can we live and die and never know the difference?"

=== From others ===
- "Still makes the rest of us look academic." --Jackson Pollock
- "His show (at Peggy Guggenheim's The Art of This Century Gallery in 1946), of all those early shows [Pollock, Rothko, Motherwell], was the most original. A bolt out of the blue. Most of us were still working through images ... Still had none."--Robert Motherwell
- "When I first saw a 1948 painting of Still's ... I was impressed as never before by how estranging and upsetting genuine originality in art can be."--Clement Greenberg, art critic; "American-Type Painting", Partisan Review, 1955, p. 58.
- "It was in the mid-1940s that Still asserted himself as one of the most formally inventive artists of his generation."

--John Golding, art historian; Paths to the Absolute, 2000, Princeton University Press

- "With their crude palette-knifed and troweled surfaces, their immense space, their strong color, their relentless vertical and horizontal expansiveness, Still's abstract works project a forcefulness perhaps unequaled in Abstract Expressionist painting."

--Stephen Polcari, art historian; Abstract Expressionism and the Modern Experience, 1991, Cambridge University Press

- "A singular talent whose dimension will not be fully known in his own lifetime."--Robert Hughes, former Time art critic; Time, Prairie Coriolanus, February 9, 1976

== See also ==
- List of single-artist museums
