= Albert Young =

Albert Young may refer to:

- Albert Young (American football) (born 1985), football player for the Minnesota Vikings
- Albert Young (boxer) (1877–1940), American boxer
- Albert Young (footballer) (1917–2013), Welsh footballer
- Albert Young (poet), writer and poet
- Victor Young (Albert Victor Young, 1899–1956), American violinist, composer and conductor

== See also ==
- Bert Young (disambiguation)
