= St. Louis Missouri Temple =

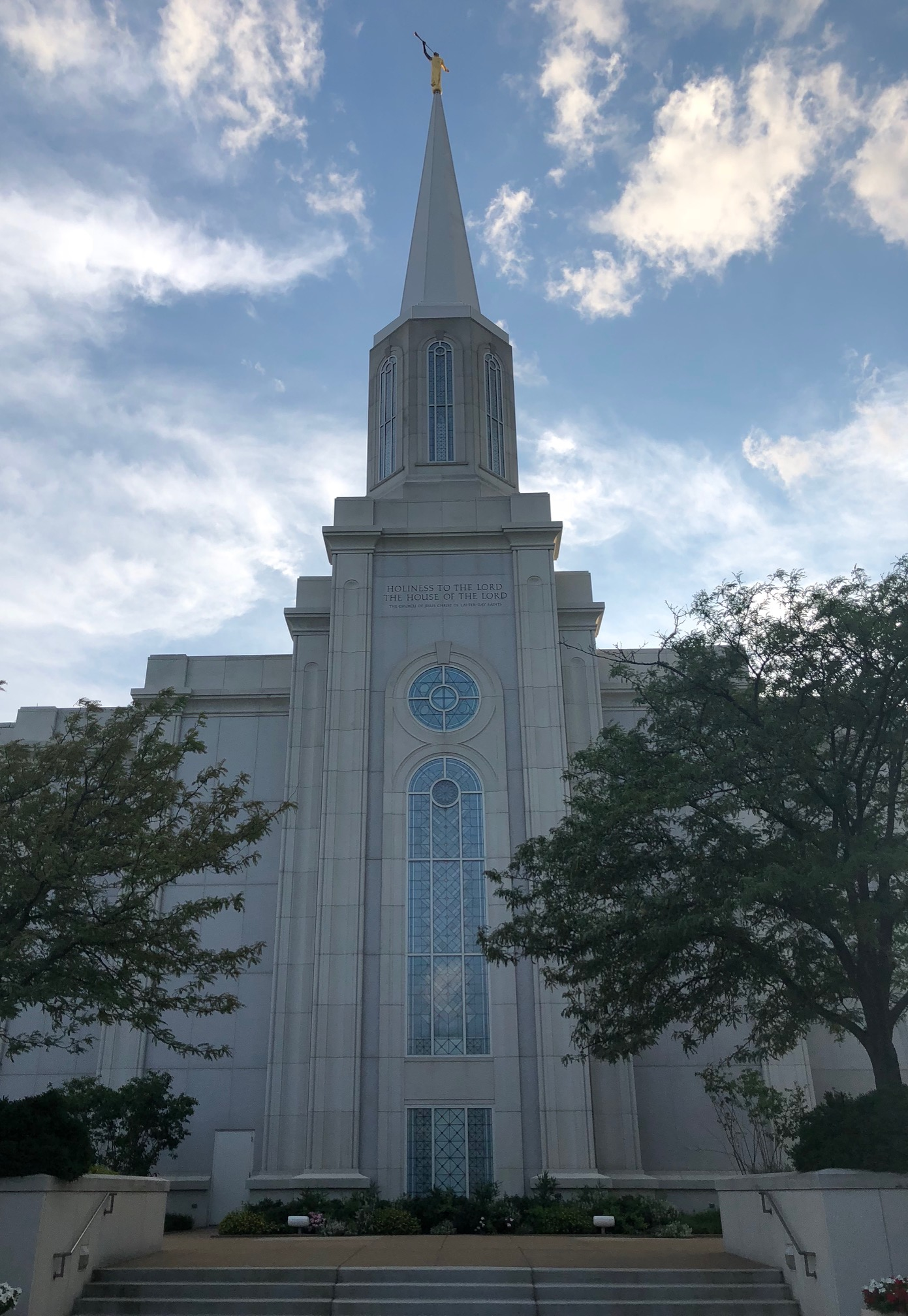
- Interactive map of St. Louis Missouri Temple
- Number: 50
- Dedication: June 1, 1997, by Gordon B. Hinckley
- Site: 14 acres (5.7 ha)
- Floor area: 58,749 ft^{2} (5,458.0 m^{2})
- Height: 150 ft (46 m)
- Official website • News & images

Church chronology
← Mount Timpanogos Utah Temple	St. Louis Missouri Temple	→ Vernal Utah Temple

Additional information
- Announced: December 29, 1990, by Ezra Taft Benson
- Groundbreaking: October 30, 1993, by Gordon B. Hinckley
- Open house: April 26 – May 24, 1997
- Current president: Robert W. Jones
- Designed by: Chiodini Associates
- Location: Town and Country, Missouri, United States
- Coordinates: 38°38′23″N 90°27′53″W
- Exterior finish: Cast stone and Bethal white granite with thermal finish
- Design: Classic modern, single-spire design
- Baptistries: 1
- Ordinance rooms: 4 (stationary)
- Sealing rooms: 4
- Clothing rental: Yes
- Visitors' center: Yes

The St. Louis Missouri Temple is the 50th operating temple of the Church of Jesus Christ of Latter-day Saints, located in Town and Country, Missouri, a suburb of St. Louis. The intent to build the temple was announced on December 18, 1990, by the church's First Presidency. It is the first in the city and county of St. Louis, and in the state of Missouri.

The temple has a gold-colored statue of the angel Moroni on top of its spire. It was designed by Chiodini Associates, using a modern architectural style. A groundbreaking ceremony was held on October 30, 1993, conducted by church president Gordon B. Hinckley.

== History ==
The church's First Presidency announced the temple on December 29, 1990. The church later announced it would be built on a 14-acre property at 12555 North Outer Forty Drive in Town and Country. Preliminary plans called for a single-story structure of approximately 58,749 square feet. It is historically significant as the church's 50th operating temple.

The St. Louis Missouri Temple is a significant landmark in a state where early church members faced severe persecution. In the 19th century, many Latter-day Saints fled to St. Louis, which became a refuge for those escaping violence in other parts of Missouri. The city provided tolerance and support to church members, particularly following Missouri’s 1838 extermination order. After the martyrdom of Joseph Smith in 1844, St. Louis leaders publicly condemned his murder, further solidifying the city's role as a refuge for early church members.

On October 30, 1993, during the temple’s groundbreaking ceremony, church president Hinckley reflected on this history, acknowledging the hardships endured by early church members in Missouri. Three years later, during the temple’s dedication on June 1, 1997, Hinckley emphasized the temple’s role as a place of peace and refuge. The dedicatory prayer also recognized the historical suffering of adherents in Missouri while expressing gratitude for the improved relationship between the church and the state.

In addition to Hinckley, attendees at the October 30, 1993, groundbreaking ceremony included Thomas S. Monson of the First Presidency, and Dallin H. Oaks, of the Quorum of the Twelve Apostles. After construction was completed, a public open house was held from April 26 to May 24, 1997, with approximately 260,000 visitors.

The temple was dedicated on June 1, 1997, by Hinckley. Unlike many temples, the dedication took place over five days, from June 1 to June 5, 1997, in 19 sessions. The dedicatory prayer was read by all members of the First Presidency—with Hinckley reading it the first two days, followed by Monson and James E. Faust in subsequent sessions.

The temple has a total of 58,749 square feet (5,458.0 m^{2}), four ordinance rooms, and four sealing rooms. It has a white granite exterior and a 150-foot (46 m) spire with a gold-leafed statue of the angel Moroni, which stands at approximately 8.5-foot (2.6 m).

== Design and architecture ==
The St. Louis Missouri Temple has modern architectural elements and traditional Latter-day Saint temple design. The structure is approximately 60,000 square feet, features a white granite exterior, with the 150-foot spire including a gold-colored statue of the angel Moroni.

The temple is on a 14-acre plot, with surrounding landscaping, tree-lined walkways, and a circular water feature. The single-story structure is constructed with Bethel White granite.

The temple includes four ordinance rooms, four sealing rooms, and a baptistry. The celestial room has a domed ceiling and a crystal chandelier, intended to create a spiritually uplifting environment.

The design has six-pointed stars, reminiscent of the Star of David, symbolizing Jesus Christ and His lineage. The angel Moroni statue represents the restoration of the Gospel of Jesus Christ through Joseph Smith.

== Temple presidents and use ==
The church's temples are directed by a temple president and matron, each serving for a term of three years. The president and matron oversee the administration of temple operations and provide guidance and training for both temple patrons and staff.

Serving from 1997 to 2000, the first president of the St. Louis Missouri Temple was Menlo F. Smith, with Mary J. Smith as matron. As of 2024, Robert W. Jones is the president, with Alessandra M. Jones serving as matron.

Like all the church's temples, it is not used for Sunday worship services. To members of the church, temples are regarded as sacred houses of the Lord. Once dedicated, only church members with a current temple recommend can enter for worship.

== Gallery ==
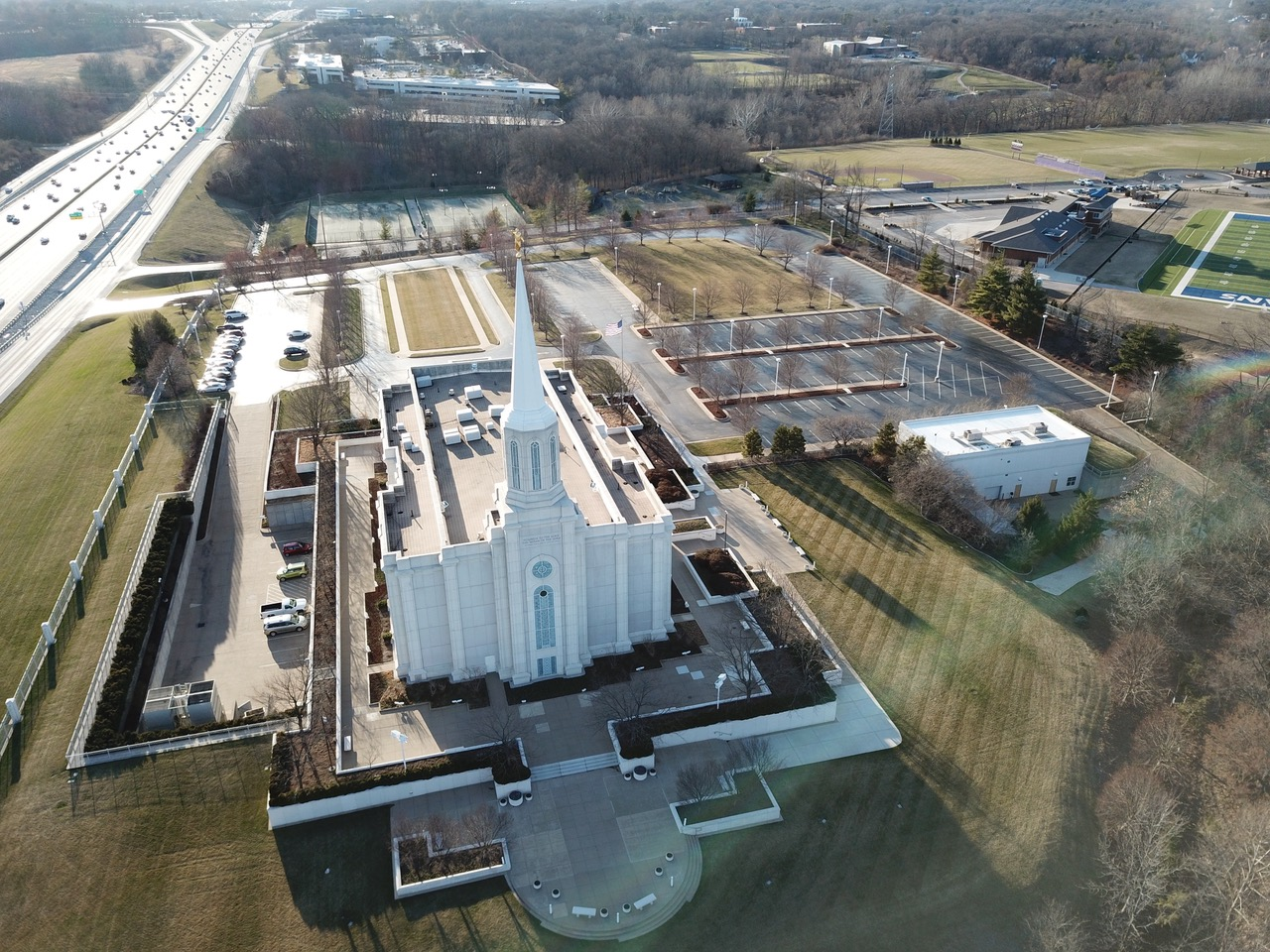
St. Louis Missouri Temple, 2018

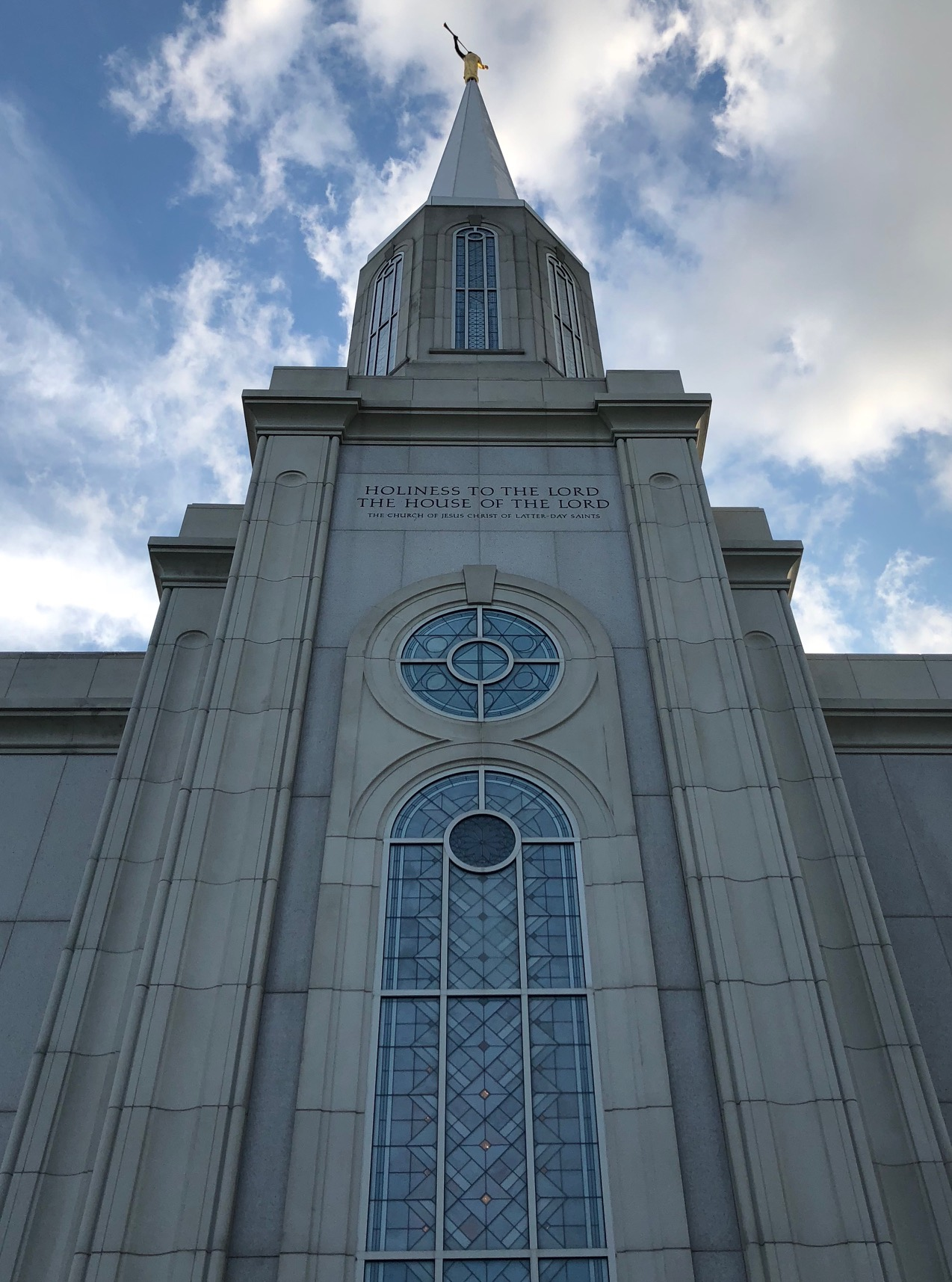
Temple, east

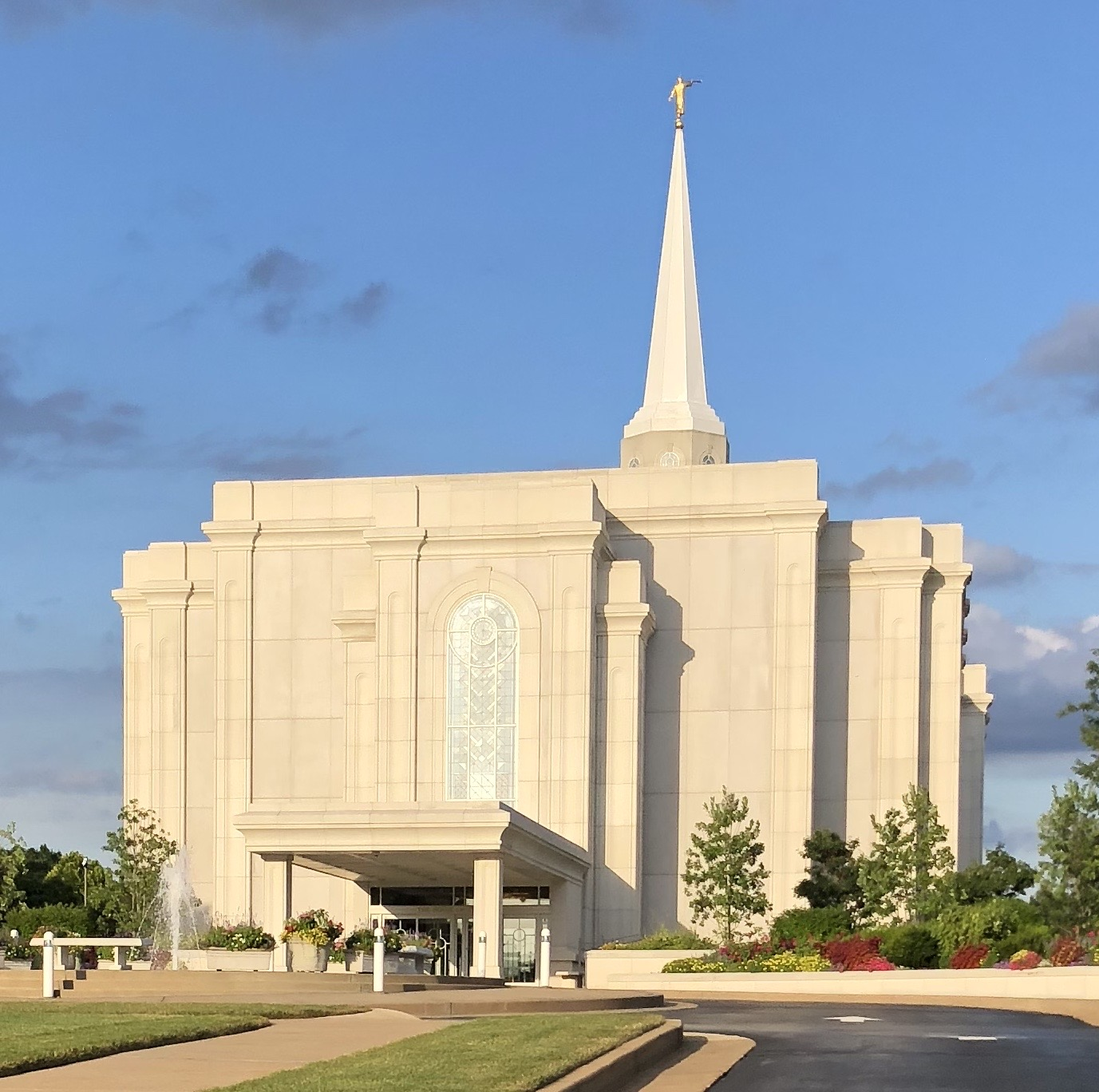
Temple, west

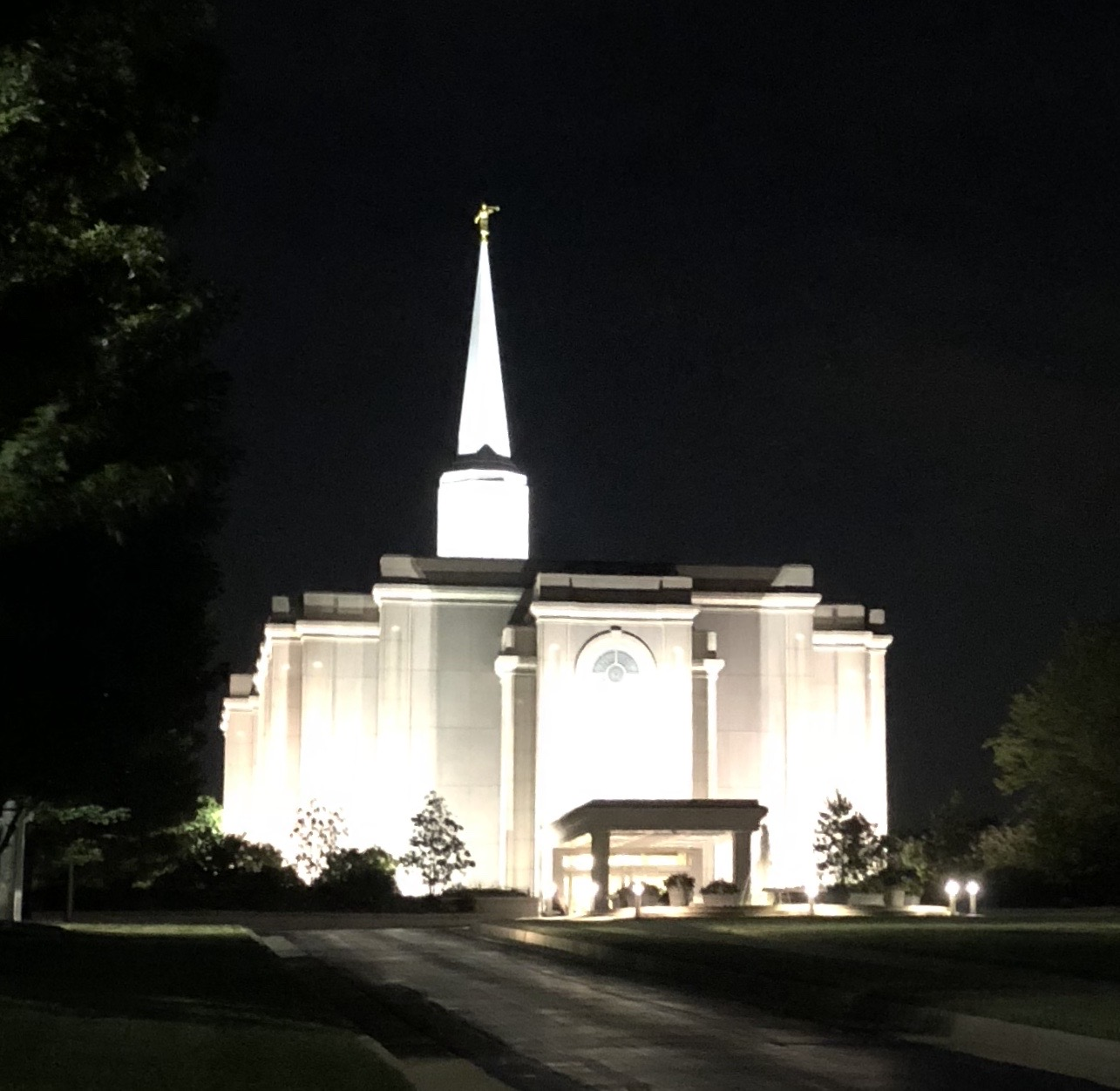
Temple at night, 2018

== See also ==
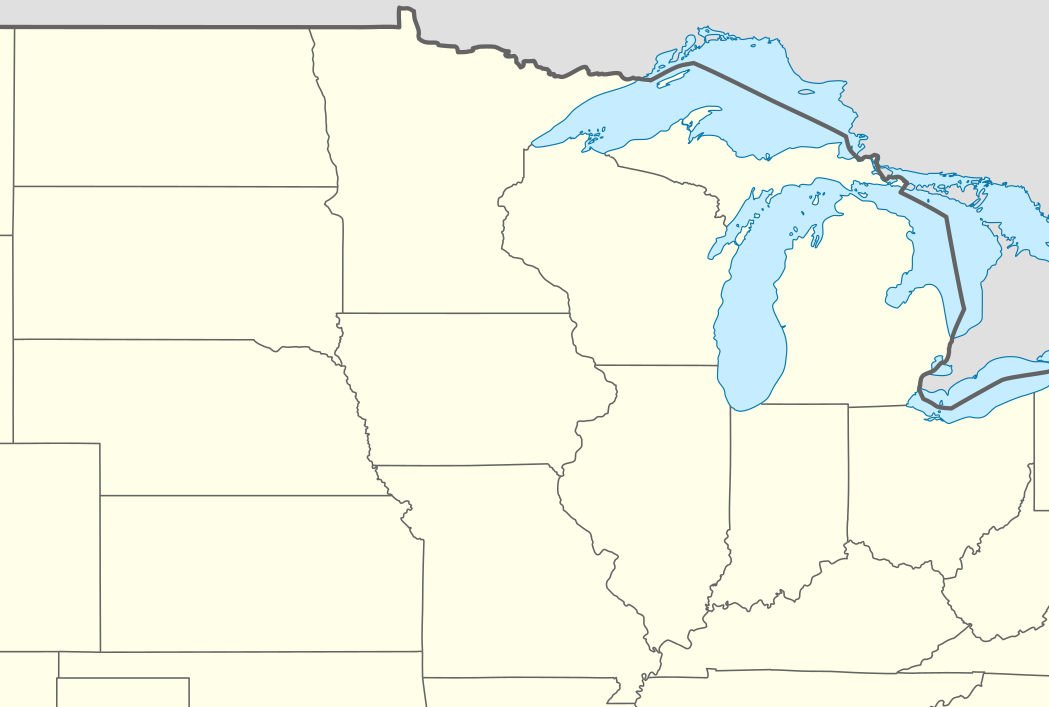
Temples in the United States Midwest
- = Operating
- = Under construction
- = Announced
- = Closed for renovation
- Comparison of temples (LDS Church)
- List of temples (LDS Church)
- List of temples by geographic region (LDS Church)
- Temple architecture (LDS Church)
- The Church of Jesus Christ of Latter-day Saints in Missouri
