= Bob Young (Scottish footballer) =

Scottish footballer (1886–1970)

Personal information
- Full name: Robert Miller Young
- Date of birth: 1886
- Place of birth: Auchterarder, Scotland
- Date of death: 1970 (aged 83)
- Position: Full back

Senior career*
Years	Team	Apps	(Gls)
1906–1921	Queen's Park	127	(1)
1917–1918	→ Clyde (loan)	1	(0)
1918–1919	→ Motherwell (loan)	2	(1)
- * Club domestic league appearances and goals

Robert Miller Young (1886–1970) was a Scottish amateur footballer who played as a full back in the Scottish League for Queen's Park. He captained the club and after his retirement as a player was a member of the committee and acted as Honorary Treasurer. Young also played for Motherwell and Clyde.

== Personal life ==
Young was the older brother of footballer John Young. Prior to the First World War, he worked as an iron merchant's clerk. After Britain's entry into the war in August 1914, Young enlisted as a private in the Highland Light Infantry and was commissioned as a lieutenant in the Cameronians (Scottish Rifles) in late 1915. Young was shot in the knee in 1917 and evacuated to a hospital in London, but the injury did not prevent him from returning to football before the end of the year. He moved to Manchester in 1929.
