= Hubert Young =

Hubert Young may refer to:

- Hubert Young (cricketer) (1911–?), Jamaican cricketer
- Hubert Winthrop Young (1885–1950), British politician and soldier
