= Robert Young (footballer) =

Scottish footballer

Personal information
- Full name: Robert Thomson Young
- Date of birth: 7 September 1886
- Place of birth: Stonehouse, South Lanarkshire, Scotland
- Date of death: 9 March 1955 (aged 68)
- Height: 5 ft 10 1/2 in (1.79 m)
- Position: Centre back

Senior career*
Years	Team	Apps	(Gls)
1903–1904	Swinhill Hearts		
1904–1905	Larkhall Thistle		
1905–1907	St. Mirren	9	(0)
1907–1908	West Ham United	44	
1908–1910	Middlesbrough	34	(5)
1910–1911	Everton	38	(7)
1911–1914	Wolverhampton Wanderers	67	(10)
- * Club domestic league appearances and goals

Robert Thomson Young (1886–1955) was a Scottish footballer who played as a centre back in the Scottish League for St. Mirren. He moved to England in 1907, signing for Southern League side West Ham United. He later played for Middlesbrough, Everton, and Wolverhampton Wanderers.
