= Ed J. Pinegar =

Ed Jolley Pinegar (February 12, 1935 – August 18, 2020) was an American author, educator and leader in the Church of Jesus Christ of Latter-day Saints (LDS Church). His books include Look to the Temple, Raising the Bar, and several works dealing with the study of the Book of Mormon. Many of his books were written with LDS author Richard J. Allen. With Rodger Dean Duncan, Pinegar is co-author of the book Leadership for Saints.

== Life and career ==
Pinegar received a bachelor's degree from Brigham Young University (BYU) and a degree in dentistry from the University of Southern California. He married Patricia P. Pinegar, a former general president of the LDS Church's Primary organization, and they are the parents of eight children.

Pinegar served in the LDS Church as a bishop (twice), the first president of the BYU 20th Stake from 1999 to 2004, a stake patriarch, on the general board of the church's Young Men organization, as president of the England London South Mission, and as president of the Provo Missionary Training Center (1988–1991). He has also been director of the Orem Institute of Religion, a religion professor at BYU, and a seminary teacher.

Pinegar and his wife also served as missionaries in the New York Rochester Mission. From 2009 to 2012, Pinegar served as president of the Manti Utah Temple.

Pinegar died on August 18, 2020, at the age of 85.
