= Nespelem (art) =

Nespelem art was both a movement and art colony focused on Native Americans, located in the Nespelem River area of Washington, home to the Colville Confederated Tribes. Established around 1937, artists were called upon to record Native American culture and the history of a group of significant individuals involved with American Indian events of the late 19th-century Northwest.

Unlike many artists in western Washington and Oregon, who emphasized Asian and Pacific Coast Native genres, the Nespelem artists drew attention to the past, present, and future of endangered Interior Salish culture. These elements combined to create an ideal setting for artists to capture memorable scenes for future generations.

The colony was founded by Worth Griffin and Clyfford Still, who created the first extensive visual record of the Nespelem people. Griffin and Still admitted 15 to 20 students at a time into the colony, of whom some were professionals. They put in exhaustive hours during the week on portraits and landscapes, then sketched at Grand Coulee on weekends. Finished works went in many directions, including some bequeathed to the Washington State Historical Society.
