= Manti Utah Temple =

Historic church in Utah, United States

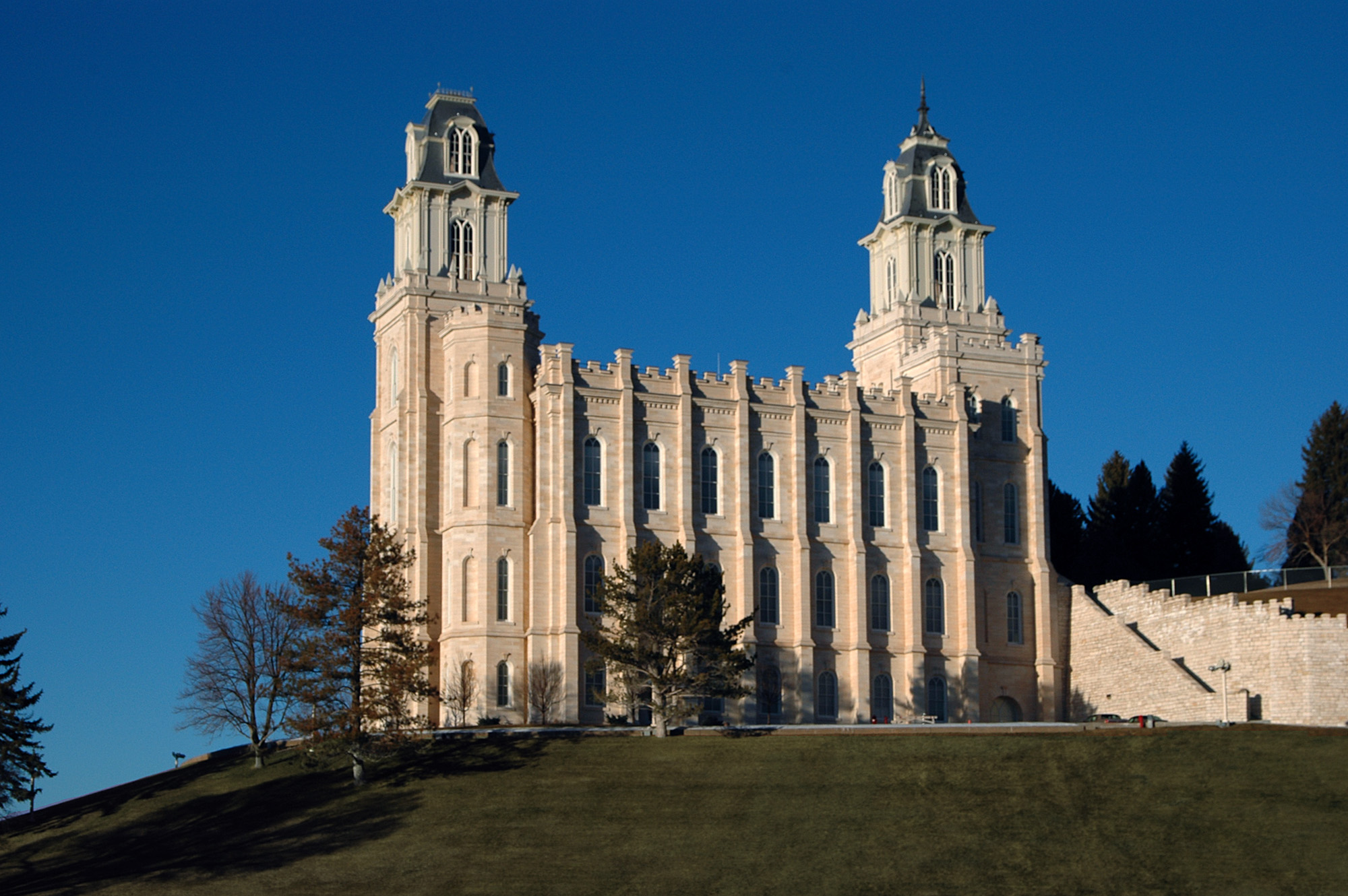
- Interactive map of Manti Utah Temple
- Number: 3
- Dedication: May 21, 1888, by Lorenzo Snow
- Site: 27 acres (11 ha)
- Floor area: 74,792 ft^{2} (6,948.4 m^{2})
- Height: 179 ft (55 m)
- Official website • News & images

Church chronology
← Logan Utah Temple	Manti Utah Temple	→ Salt Lake Temple

Additional information
- Announced: June 25, 1875, by Brigham Young
- Groundbreaking: April 25, 1877, by Brigham Young
- Open house: June 6–8, 1985 (after renovations); 14 March – 5 April 2024
- Rededicated: June 14, 1985, by Gordon B. Hinckley; 21 April 2024, by Russell M. Nelson
- Designed by: William H. Folsom
- Location: Manti, Utah, United States
- Coordinates: 39°16′22.46159″N 111°38′1.535999″W
- Exterior finish: Cream-colored oolite limestone
- Design: Castellated Gothic
- Baptistries: 1
- Ordinance rooms: 4 (four-stage progressive)
- Sealing rooms: 8
- Clothing rental: Available
- Notes: Wilford Woodruff performed a private dedication on May 17, 1888. On May 1, 2021, Russell M. Nelson announced that the temple would close for renovation on October 1, 2021.

The Manti Utah Temple (formerly the Manti Temple) is the fifth temple built by the Church of Jesus Christ of Latter-day Saints. Construction of the temple was completed in 1888. Located in the city of Manti, Utah, it was the third built west of the Mississippi River, following the Utah temples in St. George and Logan. The temple was designed by William Harrison Folsom, who relocated to Manti during its construction. Built on what is known as “Temple Hill,” it overlooks the Sanpete Valley and is visible from a considerable distance, serving as a prominent landmark in the region.

Constructed largely through the labor and resources of early Latter-day Saint settlers, the temple used pioneer-era craftsmanship and community effort from the Sanpete Valley. Like all Latter-day Saint temples, entry is available only to church members who hold a valid temple recommend. For many years, it was one of only two remaining temples in the church where a live portrayal was used in the endowment ceremony. Following its 2024 rededication, the temple now uses a filmed presentation. The building is an early example of a temple design using progressive ordinance rooms to represent stages of spiritual progression.

== History ==
In 1849, Walker, chief of the Ute band that inhabited much of the valley, invited Brigham Young to send Latter-day Saint settlers to the Sanpitch, or Sanpete, Valley, reportedly after dreaming that the Great Spirit instructed him to welcome them. That November, fifty families led by Isaac Morley founded Manti beside a barren, rocky hill. After a harsh first winter in hillside dugouts and a rattlesnake infestation the following spring, the settlers established farms and industries, and Manti grew into an agricultural center. The hill’s limestone was quarried for local buildings and a block sent to the Washington Monument. In 1875, Brigham Young and other Church leaders designated it as the site of a temple. The hill, later known as Temple Hill, had long been associated with expectations of a temple.

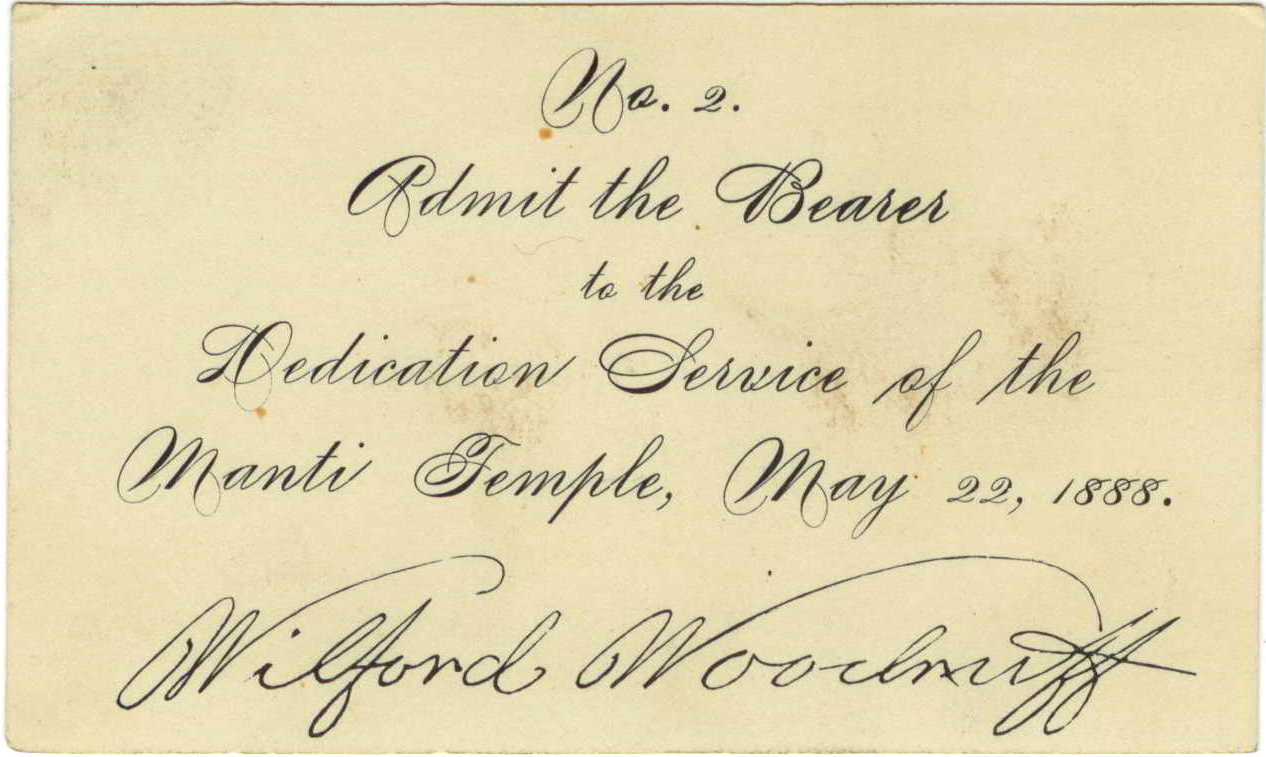
Manti Temple dedication admission, signed by Wilford Woodruff

Church president Brigham Young announced plans to build a temple in Manti on June 25, 1875, dedicated the site and broke the ground on April 25, 1877. Construction began soon afterward and continued for approximately 11 years. Its cornerstones were laid on April 14, 1879. The temple was built on a partially leveled hill, which required 2,400 cords of rock to terrace the site. Wilford Woodruff dedicated the completed temple in May 1888. During the 1880s, as the federal government sought to confiscate Church property under antipolygamy legislation, the Manti Temple Association was organized as a private corporation to hold title to the temple and its grounds. The title was transferred to the Church in 1925.

The Manti Temple was one of three Utah temples, the others being in St. George and Logan, built before the Salt Lake Temple was completed in 1893. It was dedicated during the apostolic interregnum following the death of Church president John Taylor, making it one of the few temples dedicated without a Church president in office. The temple housed the Holy of Holies until the dedication of the Salt Lake Temple in 1893. The room was subsequently used for sealings before being closed in the late 1970s. By 1966, the Manti, Logan, and Salt Lake temples together accounted for 52 percent of all temple ordinances, contributing to the construction of additional temples in Utah.

=== Renovations ===
The Manti Utah Temple has undergone various remodeling and renovations since its completion. In 1907, construction began on a large stone stairway leading up the hill to the west entrance. In 1935, the temple was fully lit at night for the first time. In 1940, the stairway was removed to improve the surrounding grounds. Between 1944 and 1945, significant interior renovations were carried out, including updates to facilities and paintings in the ordinance rooms.

The temple underwent a major modernization beginning in 1981, including structural improvements, installation of mechanical systems, restoration of murals and furnishings, and the addition of an elevator and updated facilities. Following this work, the temple was rededicated in June 1985 by Gordon B. Hinckley, a counselor in the church's First Presidency.

In April 2019, church president Russell M. Nelson announced the intent to perform major renovations to preserve pioneer-era temples while upgrading structural systems and functionality. The Manti Utah Temple closed in October 2021 to begin a comprehensive renovation lasting approximately two and a half years.

The renovation included mechanical and plumbing upgrades, waterproofing, accessibility improvements such as a new ADA-compliant entrance, and interior updates including a new marriage waiting room, expanded locker areas, and refurbished finishes. A new north-side entrance, gathering space, and designated bridal exit were also added, along with landscape improvements to the temple grounds. Technological upgrades, including audiovisual systems, were incorporated to support updated presentation methods.

A central component of the project was the conservation and restoration of historic murals. Art conservators carried out detailed cleaning and stabilization work, removing layers of varnish and overpainting to restore the original appearance while preserving the artists’ intent. The work was described as highly meticulous, requiring precise, incremental treatment to avoid damaging original materials.

Following completion of the renovation, a public open house was held from March 14 to April 5, 2024 (excluding Sundays), attracting tens of thousands of visitors. The temple returned to regular operations after it was rededicated by Russell M. Nelson on April 21, 2024, in a single session.

=== Mural preservation ===
In March 2021, the First Presidency announced plans to renovate the Manti Utah Temple, including replacing live endowment presentations with filmed sessions and reconfiguring interior spaces. Initial plans called for removing, documenting, and relocating historic murals to accommodate these changes, with portions intended for preservation and public display.

The announcement prompted public reaction, including petitions and advocacy efforts expressing concern over the potential loss of historic artwork, particularly murals by Minerva Teichert. In response, church leaders stated that they would consult preservation specialists regarding the future of the murals.

On May 1, 2021, Nelson announced a revision to the renovation plans, stating that the temple’s historic interior, including its murals, would be preserved in place. He emphasized the importance of maintaining the building’s “pioneer craftsmanship, artwork and character,” while also announcing plans for the construction of a new temple in nearby Ephraim, Utah, to accommodate regional needs.

=== Temple presidents ===
The church’s temples are directed by a temple president and matron, who typically serve three-year terms and oversee temple operations, as well as provide guidance and training for temple workers and patrons.

Notable temple presidents include: Daniel H. Wells (1888–1891); Anthon H. Lund (1891–1893); John D. T. McAllister (1893–1906); Robert D. Young (1933–1943); Jack H. Goaslind Jr. (2000–2003), and Ed J. Pinegar (2009–2012). As of January 2026, the temple president and matron are Richard W. and Linda N. Wheeler.

== Architecture and design ==
Detail of the north wall of the Garden Room as painted by Minerva Teichert. A window can be seen as a suggestion of scale.

The Manti Utah Temple uses Gothic Revival, French Renaissance Revival, Second Empire, and other 19th-century architectural styles. Constructed of locally quarried oolitic limestone, it reflects both the materials and craftsmanship of early Latter-day Saint settlers.

The temple has 100,373 square feet (9,325 m²) of floor space and contains multiple ordinance rooms and sealing rooms. Its two towers rise to 179 feet on the east and 169 feet on the west. Two spiral staircases connect its levels, each rising more than 76 feet through six revolutions and containing 151 steps. The northern staircase turns clockwise and the southern counterclockwise; in 1988, they were described as among only three large stairways of their type in the United States. The interior also retains historic features, including original woodwork, flooring, and decorative elements that have been preserved through successive renovations.

=== Art ===
The temple contains murals by several Latter-day Saint artists, including C. C. A. Christensen (Creation Room, 1886–87), Minerva Teichert (World Room, 1947, assisted by Frank Stevens), Robert L. Shepherd (Garden Room, 1946), John Hafen, J. B. Fairbanks, and Dan Weggeland. These murals depict scenes associated with the Latter-day Saint endowment narrative.

Many of the murals function as visual representations of theological concepts and stages of spiritual progression. Christensen’s Creation Room mural, for example, portrays the formation of the earth through successive stages, while the Garden Room mural represents the Garden of Eden and humanity’s early spiritual state. Some murals were transferred to canvas during earlier renovations due to deterioration, while others remain on original plaster surfaces.

Teichert’s World Room mural, completed in 1947, spans nearly 4,000 square feet and includes approximately 120 figures depicting scenes such as the Tower of Babel and the gathering of peoples. She was the first woman commissioned to paint a temple mural for the church, and completed the work in a relatively short period with the assistance of Frank Stevens. She later described the mural as a “great pageant”.

Some original murals were damaged beyond preservation and were subsequently covered or replaced during earlier renovations; however, at least one pioneer-era mural, including Dan Weggeland’s Garden Room work, survives beneath later artwork. The temple also contains additional paintings, including works by Christensen depicting both the temple site prior to construction and the completed building.

== See also ==
- The Church of Jesus Christ of Latter-day Saints in Utah
- Comparison of temples (LDS Church)
- List of temples (LDS Church)
- List of temples by geographic region (LDS Church)
- Temple architecture (LDS Church)
- Mormon Miracle Pageant
