= Robert De Young =

American politician (1924–2011)

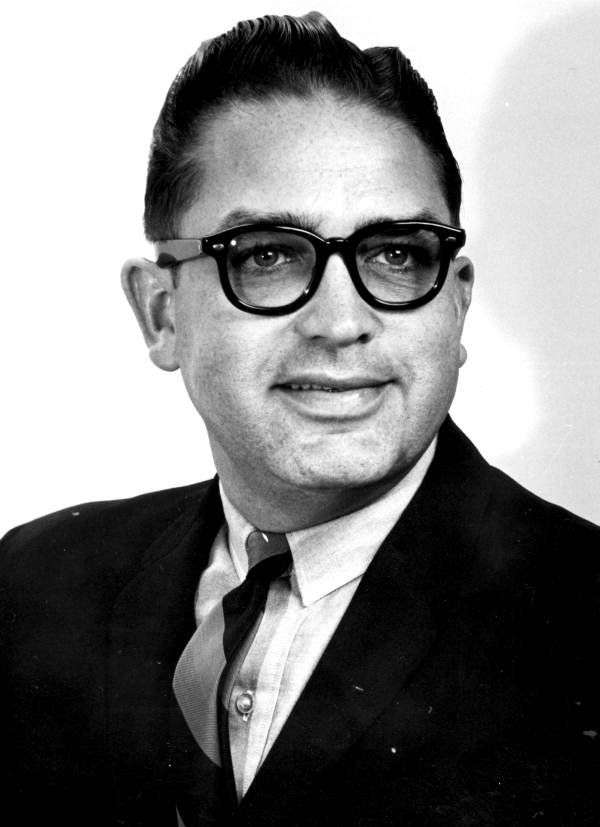

Member of the Florida House of Representatives from the 79th district
- In office 1966–1968

Personal details
- Born: February 22, 1924 Orange City, Iowa, U.S.
- Died: February 15, 2011 (aged 86) Phoenix, Arizona, U.S.
- Party: Republican
- Education: University of Northern Colorado
- Occupation: insurance/real estate

Robert C. De Young (February 22, 1924 – February 15, 2011), was a politician in the American state of Florida. He served in the Florida House of Representatives from 1966 to 1968, representing the 79th district.
