= Robert D. Young (LDS Church leader) =

Scottish-American politician and religious leader (1867–1962)

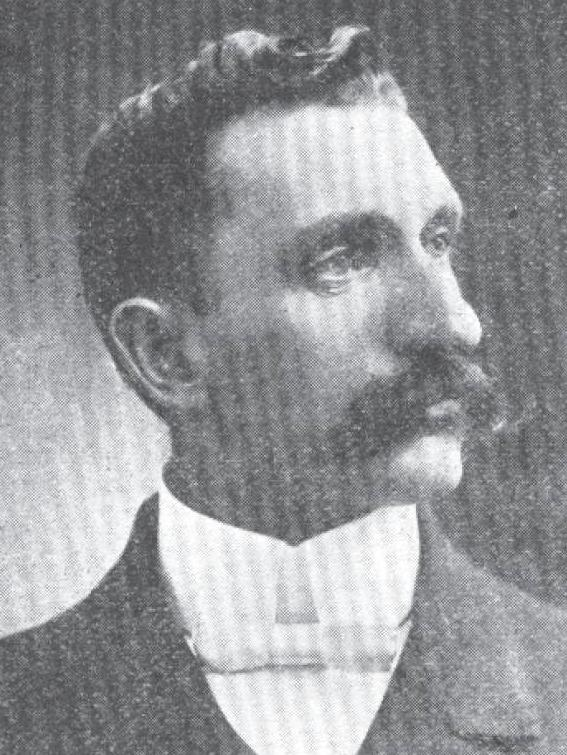

Personal details
- Born: Robert Dixon Young; July 24, 1867; Kirkintilloch, Dunbartonshire, Scotland
- Died: June 12, 1962 (aged 94); Richfield, Utah, US
- Resting place: Richfield City Cemetery; 38.778°N 112.088°W

Robert Dixon Young (July 24, 1867 – June 12, 1962) was a Scottish-American politician and leader in The Church of Jesus Christ of Latter-day Saints (LDS Church).

== Early life ==
Young was born in Kirkintilloch, Dunbartonshire, Scotland, on July 24, 1867. His parents were Mary (née Graham) and Archibald M. Young. In 1872, he immigrated to the United States with his parents, who as Latter-day Saints wanted to join with the body of church members. They lived in Salt Lake City for about a year and then moved to Richfield, Utah.

On July 5, 1875, Young was baptized by Christopher Jenson Kempe and confirmed by William H. Seegmiller. He was educated at common schools. As a youth, he returned to Salt Lake City, where he played amateur baseball but turned down offers to play as a professional.

== Career ==
On May 15, 1891, Young was ordained a seventy by Francis M. Lyman. He was ordained a high priest by Lyman and became a member of the high council of the Sevier Stake Tabernacle on July 2, 1896. Young was the president and the general manager of construction for the Otter Creek Reservoir Company from 1897 to 1901.

Young was a missionary for the LDS Church in Australia from 1901 to 1904, overseeing the Queensland conference. Returning to Utah, he again became the president of the Otter Creek Reservoir Company. He helped plan and develop the Otter Creek Reservoir, the Piute Creek Reservoir, and the Sevier Valley Reservoir.

Young was selected to serve as a second counselor of the Sevier Stake on December 31, 1904, starting on March 11, 1905. On September 18 1910, Young became president of the Sevier Stake of Zion, which was at that point coterminous with Sevier County, Utah. In 1921, the stake was divided into three, and Young continued as president of the Sevier Stake, which was reduced to having only Richfield and such neighboring towns as Glenwood and Venice.

Young was served on the Richfield City Council and was elected mayor of Richfield. He was also a member of the Utah State Board of Education. Young was released as president of the Sevier Stake in 1933 when he was called to serve as president of the Manti Temple. He served in this position until 1943.

After returning to Salt Lake City, he was the superintendent of the Latter-day Saints Hospital. In this capacity, he oversaw significant expansion of the building. Young was the president of the Salt Lake Temple from July 1949 to 1953. From 1954 until he died, he served as the chief receptionist for the Church Office Building.

== Personal life and death ==
On October 28, 1891, Young married Mary Susannah Parker. They had eight children, 24 grandchildren, and 32 great-grandchildren. She died on April 1, 1960. He died on June 12, 1962, aged 94, in Salt Lake Hospital. Speakers at his funeral at the Salt Lake Temple included Harold B. Lee and LeGrand Richards of the Council of Twelve. He was buried in Richfield City Cemetery.
