= Robert Young (sternwheeler) =

American stern-wheel driven steamboat

- Steamer Robert Young trapped in ice in the Willamette River near Oregon City, January 1930.

History
- Name: Robert Young ex Nespelem
- Owner: Miller Navigation Co. (as Nespelem) (1917-1920); Western Transportation & Towing Co. (as Robert Young)(1920-1935)
- Route: Willamette and Columbia rivers
- Builder: Charles S. Miller
- Launched: October 22, 1917
- Completed: December 1917
- Out of service: November 1935
- Identification: U.S. # 215759
- Fate: Wrecked, raised, converted to floating machine shop

General characteristics
- Class & type: riverine all-purpose
- Tonnage: 349 gross tons; 292 registered tons
- Length: 130.5 ft (39.8 m) over hull (exclusive of fantail); 150 ft (45.7 m) including fantail
- Beam: 26.1 ft (8.0 m) over hull (exclusive of guards)
- Draft: About 2.5 ft (0.76 m)
- Depth: 5.2 ft (1.58 m)
- Installed power: twin steam engines, horizontally mounted, each with bore of 14 in (35.6 cm) and stroke of 72 ft (21.9 m), 185 indicated horsepower
- Propulsion: stern-wheel
- Speed: About 18 miles per hour under good conditions.
- Crew: 14

Robert Young was a stern-wheel driven steamboat that operated on the Columbia and Willamette rivers from 1918 to 1935. This vessel was originally named Nespelem, and operated under that name until 1920. From 1920 to 1935, this vessel was owned by the Western Transportation Company or one of its subsidiaries, and was employed primarily in service to paper mills.

== Construction ==
Robert Young was originally named Nespelem. Nespelem was built in 1918 for the Miller Navigation Company at Wenatchee, Washington. Nespelem was completed in December 1917. Nespelem was one of the last two steamboats to be constructed in the Wenatchee stretch of the Columbia River The other steamer was the Bridgeport, (438 tons, 121.5 feet) built at Pateros, Washington.

== Miller Navigation Company ==
The Miller Navigation Company was organized by three experienced steamboat men, Capt. Charles S. Miller, A. E. Davidson, and W. H. Gatward, all of whom were residents of Spokane, Washington. The authorized capitalization of the company was $50,000. Miller was to be the president and Davidson would be the secretary and chief engineer.

In May 1917 Miller Navigation Co. announced that it had its first steamer under construction, at Kelso, Washington a considerable distance away from its intended operations on the upper Columbia River. This steamer was expected to be ready for service between July 15 and August 1, 1917. It would carry 200 tons of cargo, and when empty would draw about 20 inches of water. When loaded, the vessel would draw four and one-half feet.

The company intended to operate from a down river connection at Brewster, Washington, where it would connect with the northern terminus of the Great Northern Railway. Alternatively, the downriver terminus would be at Pateros, Washington where there were better wharf facilities. The upper end of the anticipated route would be at Grand Rapids, which was about five mlles downstream from Kettle Falls, Washington. It was about 180 miles from Pateros to Grand Rapids.

Other backers of the Miller Navigation Company were the Porter brothers, who were well-known railroad contractors who owned land in the area of Hunter, Washington.

== Design and dimensions ==
When built as Nespelem, the vessel was 130.5 ft (39.8 m) measured over the hull, and exclusive of the fantail, which was the overhanging extension of the main deck over the stern, on which the sternwheel was mounted. Including the fantail, the steamer was 154 ft (46.9 m) long.

The sternwheeler had a beam (width) of 26.1 ft (8.0 m), measured over hull, and exclusive of the heavy wooden protective timbers running along the upper sides of the hull called the guards. The depth of hold was 5.2 ft (1.58 m). Nespelem required about two and one half feet depth of water to float in.

The steamer's official merchant vessel registry number was 215759. Total crew required for the vessel was 14.

== Engineering ==
The machinery for Nespelem was built by the Willamette Iron and Steel Works and had been originally installed in the sternwheeler Ione.

The twin horizontally mounted steam engines installed at construction generated 185 indicated horsepower. Each single-cylinder engine had an inside cylinder diameter, called a “bore” of 14 inches. Each cylinder drove a piston with a stroke of 72 inches. Top speed of the steamer under favorable conditions was about 18 miles an hour. The engines and machinery were advertised as generating 600 horsepower.

== Launch ==
Nespelem was built In Wenatchee, Washington, at the foot of Orondo Avenue. It was launched on October 22, 1917. On launch day, Mrs. A.C. Gibson, sister-in-law of the builder, Charles S. Miller, broke a bottle of champagne over the bow as spectators cheered. There was still more work to be done before the steamer could be placed in service. No cabin structure had yet been built, and the machinery still had to be installed. However the boiler, the machinery, and the material for the stern-wheel had already arrived at Wenatchee.

== Operations as Nespelem ==
Following construction, which had been directed by veteran shipbuilder Joseph Paquet, of Portland, Oregon, Nespelem was worked on runs between points on the Columbia River north of Wenatchee. Nespelem was reported to have made four trips to Hunter's Landing, at the mouth of the Spokane River, with the route proving unprofitable.

Nespelem was intended to carry ore, but World War I disrupted the company's plans, and Nespelem was brought down the Columbia River to Portland, Oregon, where it was sold to the Western Transportation & Towing Company. The 1919 merger of Western Transportation & Towing and Willamette Navigation Company brought Nespelem under the control of the new company, Western Transportation Co. Western Transportation Company in turn was a subsidiary of the Crown Willamette Paper Company.

=== Transfer downriver ===
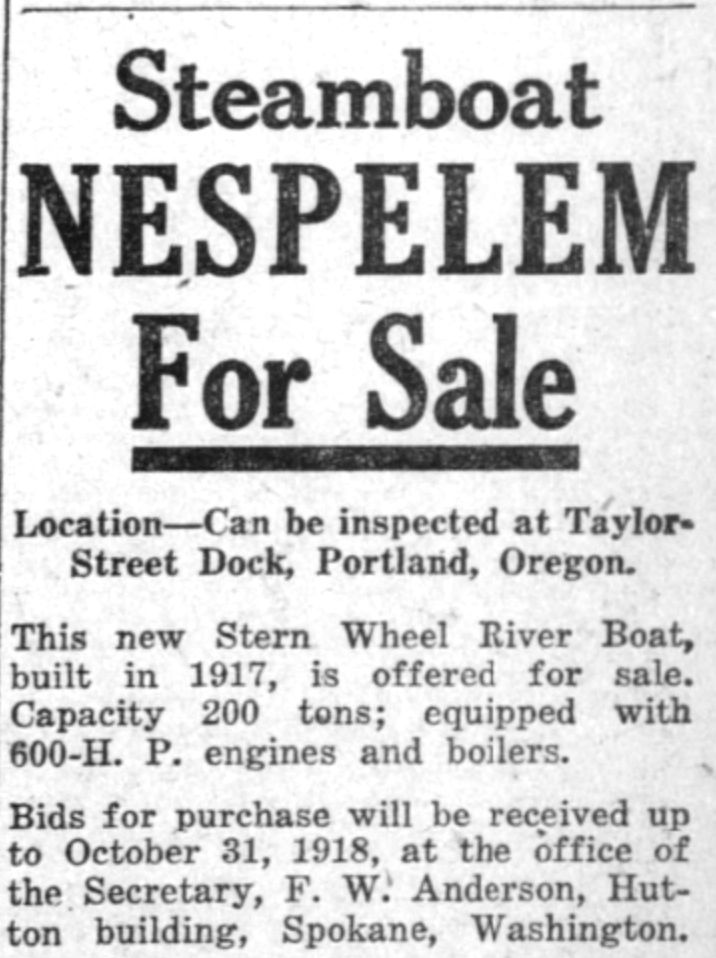
Advertisement for sale of Nespelem, October 14, 1918.

The Porter brothers had hoped to use Nespelem for hauling apples and other produce, but after a few trips proved that there was not enough business to support the expenses of the steamer. A decision was made to sell the steamer and move it downriver to Portland, Oregon.

Nespelem started downriver from Pateros, at 8:00 a.m. on Wednesday, August 14, 1918. The distance to Portland, Oregon was about 750 river miles. Capt. Charles S. Miller was in command. The most difficult parts of the run were at Priest Rapids, about 90 miles upriver from Pasco, Washington, and Rock Island, which was about 60 miles upriver from Priest Rapids, and 13 miles downstream from Wenatchee. Nespelem ran the Rock Island Rapids on August 14, and was only the third steamer to pass safely through those rapids.

The steamer was able to make an average speed of 12 miles per hour downriver to The Dalles, Oregon, after which the speed was increased to an average of 16 miles per hour, even in the face of a strong head wind.

Nespelem arrived in Portland at 6:45 p.m. on Saturday evening, August 17, 1918. The plan upon arrival was to seek to have Nespelem chartered to the People's Navigation Company, commonly called the People's Line. The steamer was not entirely complete when it arrived in Portland.

=== Negotiations with the Peoples Line ===
On October 8, 1918, negotiations with the People's Line were reported to have been completed. Work was to be begun immediately to refit Nespelem for general freight and passenger service for the run between Portland and The Dalles. The People's Line was already operating the Tahoma and (under charter from the Regulator Line) the Dalles City on this route. Once the conversion work on Nespelem was complete, it would replace Dalles City, which would be returned to the Regulator Line.

The deal with the People's Line appears not to have gone through, at least not immediately. From the 14th of October 1918 through the 31st of that same money, the Miller Navigation Company solicited bids for the sale of the steamer, which lay at the Taylor Street dock in Portland. By December 1918, Nespelem was reported to be running for the People's Line. On the night of December 11, 1918, Nespelem arrived from The Dalles, carrying 6,000 boxes of apples, much of which was for the Portland market, but other parts were intended to be loaded on rail cars to be shipped east, including the European market.

=== Truck feeder service plan ===
The steamboat business on the Columbia River encountered hard times in 1919. New automobile highways took tourists off the excursion boats, and the construction of the Spokane, Portland and Seattle Railway along the north bank of the river eliminated the need for steamboat service to the once isolated landings on that bank.

In March 1919, Nespelem became part of a plan for a new service on the Columbia river. This new service would be inaugurated by a new company, The Dalles-Columbia River Line.

This company was formed by Capt. Charles Nelson, who had been master of the Tahoma for several years, and was then the manager of the Peoples line, together with John D. Porter, and, of Spokane, F. W. Anderson and F. W. Buswell, as well as J. C. Egbert of The Dalles, and J. T. Peters of Portland. ortland lawyer George F. Shepherd would be counsel for the corporation.

The plan was, operating in conjunction with the sternwheeler Tahoma, to run to Pasco, Washington, and en route, call at Wallula, Washington, which would be a terminus for a truck service carrying agricultural products from Walla Walla, about 28 miles to the east. Improved roads seemed to favor this plan, and the businessmen of Walla Walla were reported to be enthusiastic about it.

According to Captain Nelson several thousand dollars would soon be spent to complete the cabins and make Nespelem into a freight and passenger vessel.

By late April, operation of Nespelem had been curtailed to extend no further east from Portland than The Dalles. Nespelem was scheduled to leave on its first trip on this route at 7:00 a.m. on April 29, 1919, from the Taylor Street dock in Portland. The plan was to make this run three times weekly. Business however was not sufficient to support making the run in conjunction with Tahoma, which remained tied up in Portland.

Business however apparently did not prosper. On May 21, 1919, Tahoma was sold at public auction to satisfy the claims of creditors. By June 8, 1919, Nespelem was itself out of service and tied up at the dock.

=== Fifty-two days to Albany, Oregon ===
In July 1919 Nespelem began a trip up the Willamette River from Portland to Albany, Oregon that took 52 days to complete.

Nespelem towed two large scows which were to be used in repairing the bridge across the Willamette River at Albany. Miller Navigation Co., still the owners of Nespelem, had chartered the steamer to the Portland Bridge & Building Company for the trip. V. E. Duncan, manager of Miller Navigation Co., went along and aided in solving some of the engineering problems that were encountered. Capt. Clyde Raabe served as master of the Nespelem, and Capt. Charles Nelson as first officer.

Although the steamer generally required 2.5 feet of water to float in, there were several swift-moving places in the river where the water was only 18 inches deep. During the trip, Nespelem and the towed barges often had to wait for days while the government dredge Mathloma dug out a channel deep enough to proceed. In other places lining had to be employed to clear shallow areas.

The return trip downriver from Albany to Portland took Nespelem only 48 hours, with the steamer arriving in Portland on September 14, 1919, having sustained only minor damage to its paddle wheel and loss of part of its rudder.

== Labor strife ==
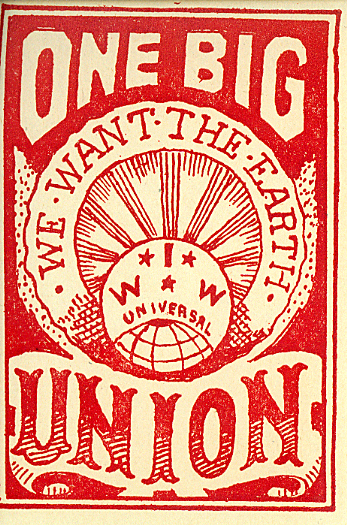
Handout card of the IWW, circa 1919

On November 14, 1919, two members of the crew of Nespelem, Robert Stevenson and Ed Collins, were arrested by federal authorities and held for investigation. Nespelem was then running on the route between Portland and Oregon City, Oregon. Stevenson and Collins were said to have disobeyed orders of the master of Nespelem, and were suspected of being members of the Industrial Workers of the World, generally referred to at the time by its initials, I.W.W.

At the same time, three I.W.W. organizers were arrested and sentenced in Portland Municipal court, before Judge Rossman on charges of vagrancy. Federal authorities were also involved in these arrests. These events occurred only a few days after a violent incident in Centralia, Washington known as the Centralia Massacre, involving the I.W.W. and members of the American Legion.

== Operations as Robert Young ==
In February 1920, Western Transportation Co. took Nespelem out of service at their Washington street dock in Portland, on the Willamette River for a general overhaul and for conversion to an oil-burner. As the overhaul neared completion, the officers of the Crown Willamette Paper Company decided to rename Nespelem as Robert Young, to honor Capt. Robert J. Young (ca. 1864- Nov. 1, 1921), the long-term manager of Western Transportation Company.

As of March 4, 1920, Robert Young was expected to be placed back in service within a week. Along with the other six steamers of the Western Transportation fleet, Robert Young would be used to provide general towing and lighterage service to the Crown Willamette paper mills at Oregon City, Oregon and Camas, Washington. In early March 1920, the owners announced who would be the officers of the Robert Young. These were: T.A. Lowery, master; Chris Bluhm, pilot; Herbert Fiddler, mate; Clarence Dillon, chief engineer; and George Toedermeier, assistant engineer.

=== Collision damage ===
On the night of November 13, 1921, Robert Young was damaged by a collision with a naval reserve patrol vessel, Eagle Boat No. 38. Robert Young was moored at the dock at the foot of Washington Street in Portland, Oregon, when Eagle Boat No. 38 approached the Morrison Bridge and signaled for the draw to open.

However the patrol craft, manned by reservists, was proceeding too fast to allow the draw to be opened, and to avoid colliding with the bridge, veered off to the side, where it impacted Robert Young, cutting through the heavy oak protective timber along the outside of the tope of the hull, called a guard, and into the sternwheeler's hull itself.

=== Crewman drowned ===
On November 5, 1925, an 18-year-old man, Teddy Farrance, fell off a barge into the Columbia river and was drowned. According to the parents of the drowned man, the death was caused by tangled life-lines on board the Robert Young. They brought a legal action seeking damages of $25,000 from Western Transportation Co. for the death of their son.

The case eventually went to trial before a jury on March 12, 1929, before Judge Campbell in the Multnomah County Circuit Court. Farrange had been an employee on Robert Young. After trial began, on March 13, 1929, the lawsuit against Western Transportation Company by Farange's parents was settled, with the company confessing judgment for $750.

=== Master's license suspended ===
On October 23, 1928, at Dobelbower Crossing (on the Columbia River between Longview and Kalama, Washington), there was a collision between the Robert Young and the ocean-going steamer Ernest H. Meyer. As a result, the license of Captain C.A. Becktell, master of the Robert Young, was suspended for 10 days by the inspectors of the U.S. steamboat inspection service.

=== Trapped in ice near Oregon City ===
Sternwheeler Robert Young trapped in ice near Oregon City, January 1930

In January 1930, with Captain Becktell in command, Robert Young became trapped in river ice in the Willamette River downriver from Jennings Lodge, Oregon, near Oregon City. Other steamers of the Western Transportation Company were also trapped in the ice at the same time, at different locations on the Willamette and Columbia rivers.

Robert Young was still trapped in the ice on January 21, 1930. On January 22, 1930, crews from the Western Transportation Company tried using blasting powder to free Robert Young from the ice, so that the vessel could be used to aid another of the company's sternwheelers, Claire, which was also trapped in the ice, at Oregon City.

Robert Young continued to be frozen in the ice through January 23. The ice finally broke up, and freed Robert Young, on the night of Thursday, January 30, 1930.

Some temporary repairs were made in Portland, and Robert Young was back in service by 4:30 p.m. on Saturday afternoon, February 1, 1930. Permanent repairs were made the next week at the Portland Shipbuilding Company.

== Disposition ==
In November 1935, Robert Young struck a submerged log and sank in the Willamette River near Oswego. The crew were able to beach the vessel before it sank in six feet of water. Western Transportation Company, owner of the Robert Young, announced that they intended to raise the vessel on the night of November 8, 1935 and return it to Portland for repairs. The log struck by the Robert Young was said to have been a hemlock sinker, which stood almost on end in 40 feet of water, with the upper end coming to about three feet from the surface of the water.

In December 1935, Robert Young was rebuilt into a floating machine shop at the Oceanic terminal in Portland. The sternwheel and the boiler was removed. The unpowered Robert Young was reported to have been abandoned in 1937.
