= John Young =

John Young most commonly refers to:

- John Young (astronaut) (1930–2018), American Moon walking astronaut
- John Young, 1st Baron Lisgar (1807–1876), British diplomat and politician

John Young may also refer to:

== Academics ==
- John Young (professor of Greek) (1747–1820), Scottish professor of Greek at the University of Glasgow
- John C. Young (pastor) (1803–1857), American educator, pastor, and president of Centre College
- John Dragon Young (1949–1996), Chinese historian
- John Lorenzo Young (1826–1881), English-Australian educationalist
- John Richardson Young (1782–1804), American physiologist

== Arts and entertainment ==
=== Performing arts ===
- Harry Anthony (a.k.a. John Young, 1870–1954), American singer
- John Young (actor, born 1916) (1916–1996), Scottish actor
- John Young (stage actor), 17th-century English stage actor
- John Young (jazz pianist) (1922–2008), American jazz pianist
- John Sacret Young (1946–2021), American author, producer, director, and screenwriter
- John Paul Young (born 1950), Australian singer
- John Bell Young (1953–2017), American concert pianist, music critic and author
- John Young (British musician) (born 1956), British keyboardist and vocalist
- John Young (composer) (born 1962), New Zealand-born composer
- John Lloyd Young (born 1975), American actor and singer
- John G. Young (filmmaker) (fl. 1990s–present), American director, producer and writer
- John Matthew Wilson Young (1822–1897), English organist

=== Visual arts ===
- John Young (engraver) (1755–1825), British mezzotint engraver, keeper of the British Institution
- John Henry Young (1880–1946), Australian art collector, art dealer and art gallery director
- John Chin Young (1909–1997), Hawaiian-born American painter
- John Zerunge Young (born 1956), Hong Kong-born Australian artist

== Business and industry ==
- John Young (agricultural reformer) (1773–1837), Scottish merchant in Nova Scotia
- John Young (architect) (1797–1877), English architect
- John Young (Scottish architect) (1826–1895)
- John Young (building contractor) (1827–1907), Australian building contractor
- John Orr Young (1886–1976), American advertiser
- John Young (brewer) (1921–2006), British chairman of Young's Brewery
- John A. Young (born 1932), American business manager
- John Young (businessman) (born ca 1948), Australian entrepreneur
- John Hardin Young (a.k.a. Jack Young, fl. 1985–present), American attorney

== Military ==
- John Young (naval officer) (c. 1740–1781), American sailor
- John Preston Young (1847–1934), American Confederate veteran, judge and historian
- John Francis Young (1893–1929), Canadian soldier
- John Darling Young (1910–1988), British lord lieutenant of Buckinghamshire
- Yang Kuo-chiang (a.k.a. John K. Young, born 1950), Chinese military leader, director-general of National Security Bureau of the Republic of China
- John J. Young Jr. (born 1962), U.S. Defense Department official

== Politics and law ==
=== Australia ===
- John Young (Australian politician) (1842–1893), New South Wales politician
- John Young (jurist) (1919–2008), Australian jurist
- John Young (judge) (born 1952), Australian jurist in the Federal Court of Australia

=== Canada ===
- John Young (seigneur) (c. 1759–1819), Scottish-born Canadian land entrepreneur, jurist, and politician
- John Young (Canadian politician) (1811–1878), member of the Canadian House of Commons
- John Young (Gloucester County, New Brunswick politician) (1841–1907), Canadian politician
- John Young (York County, New Brunswick politician) (1854–1934), Canadian politician
- John Allan Young (1895–1961), Canadian politician in Saskatchewan

=== U.K. ===
- John Young (died 1589) (by 1519–1589), English politician, MP
- John Young (MP for Marlborough), (fl. 1559), English politician, MP for Marlborough
- John Young (MP for New Shoreham) (fl. 1586–1597), English politician, MP for New Shoreham, Sussex
- John Young (Scottish politician) (1930–2011), Scottish politician, member of the Scottish Parliament

=== U.S. ===
- John Young (governor) (1802–1852), American politician, Governor of New York
- John Duncan Young (1823–1910), US congressman from Kentucky
- J. Smith Young (1834–1916), American politician
- John Russell Young (politician) (1882–1966), 18th president of the Board of Commissioners of the District of Columbia
- John Andrew Young (1916–2002), American politician from Texas
- John M. Young (1926–2010), American politician from Wisconsin
- John Young (Indiana politician), American politician from Indiana

=== Elsewhere ===
- John Young (advisor) (c. 1742–1835), British-born government advisor in the Kingdom of Hawaii

== Religion ==
- John Young (suffragan bishop in London) (1463–1526), English Catholic churchman and academic
- John Young (Regius Professor) (1514–1580), English Catholic clergyman and academic
- John Young (bishop of Rochester) (1532–1605), English academic and Anglican bishop of Rochester
- John Young (Dean of Winchester) (1585–1654), English Calvinist clergyman
- John Young (bishop of Argyll) (1624–1665), Scottish divine
- John G. Young (bishop) (1746–1813), Irish Catholic bishop
- John F. Young (1820–1885), American Episcopal bishop of Florida, translator of the hymn Silent Night
- John Willard Young (1844–1924), American Mormon apostle
- John Young (Dean of St George's Cathedral) (1914–1991), English Anglican clergyman

== Science and medicine ==
- John Radford Young (1799–1885), English mathematician, professor and author
- John Young (1823–1900), Scottish geologist
- John Young (professor of natural history) (1835–1902), Scottish naturalist and geologist, professor of natural history at Glasgow University
- John Stirling Young (1894–1971), Scottish physician, professor of pathology at Aberdeen University
- John Wesley Young (1879–1932), American mathematician
- John Zachary Young (1907–1997), English zoologist
- John Young (naturalist) (born c. 1960s), Australian naturalist

== Sports ==
=== Association football (soccer) ===
- John Young (footballer, born 1888) (1888–1915), Scottish football player
- John Young (footballer, born 1889) (1889–19??), Scottish association football player
- John Young (footballer, born 1891) (1891–1947), Scottish footballer
- John Young (footballer, born 1951), Scottish association football player and manager
- John Young (footballer, born 1957), Scottish association football player (Denver Avalanche)

=== Cricket ===
- John Young (cricketer, born 1863) (1863–1933), English cricketer
- John Young (cricketer, born 1876) (1876–1913), English cricketer
- John Young (cricketer, born 1884) (1884–1960), English cricketer

=== Other sports ===
- John Young (pitcher) (fl. 1920s), American Negro league baseball player
- John Young (swimmer) (1917–2006), Bermudian swimmer
- John Young (field hockey) (born 1934), Canadian Olympic field hockey player
- John Young (cyclist) (1936–2013), Australian cyclist
- John Young (rugby union) (1937–2020), English rugby union player
- John Young (first baseman) (1949–2016), American baseball player
- John Young (ice hockey) (born 1969), American ice hockey and roller hockey player
- John Young (racing driver) (born 1968), American racing driver
- John Paul Young (American football) (born 1939), American college and professional football coach

== Other people ==
- John Young (pioneer) (1764–1825), American surveyor
- John Young (abolitionist), (fl. 1800s), American abolitionist and Underground Railroad conductor
- John Russell Young (1840–1899), American writer, diplomat, and Librarian of Congress
- John P. Young (1849–1921), American writer and editor of the San Francisco Chronicle
- John Young (police officer) (1888–1952), New Zealand baker, policeman, unionist and police commissioner
- John C. Young (1912–1987), Chinese-American civic leader, key figure in the development of Chinatown, San Francisco
- John Young (Cryptome) (1935–2025), American activist and architect

== Other uses ==
- John Young Parkway, American roadway in Florida
- John W. Young Round Barn, American historic building in Tama County, Iowa
- USS John Young, American warship

== See also ==
- Jack Young (disambiguation)
- Jock Young (disambiguation)
- Johnny Young (disambiguation)
- John Yonge (disambiguation)
- John Young Brown (disambiguation)
- Jonathan Young (disambiguation)
- John Youngs (disambiguation)
