= Artists Futures Fund =

UK charity to support artists

The Artists Futures Fund, formerly the Artists' Benevolent Fund, is a British charity that supports artists. It was instituted in 1810 and incorporated by royal charter on 2 August 1827. It has also been referred to as the Artists' Fund and the Artists' Joint Stock Fund. The fund is formally named The Society for the Management and Distribution of The Artists Fund.

== Artists Futures Fund ==
In 2024, the Board of Trustees took the decision to change the working name of the charity to Artists Futures Fund. Today, the work of the Fund reflects the changes in the art world that have happened since the beginning of the 19th century. The Fund’s objectives were redefined by the Trustees as being ‘a charity that supports visual artists of all kinds’.

Through Artist Fellowships and Award programmes, the Fund awards bursaries and provides professional develop support to contemporary artists who are facing economic, social, cultural or health barriers that prevent them from pursuing their own artistic futures.

== History ==
As of 1851, it was one of two charitable funds established for purposes relative to those who had been unfortunate in the practice of the fine arts, the other being the Artists' General Benevolent Institution.

As of 1852, it consisted of two separate and distinct branches: the Artists' Annuity Fund, and the Artists' Benevolent Fund. The first was supported by the contributions of its members, for their own relief in sickness or superannuation. All artists of merit in painting, sculpture, architecture, and engraving, were eligible to become members, the annual payments to which were regulated by the age of the member, increasing a small sum every year. The amount of funded property was £14,900, exclusively the property of the members themselves. The second was supported by the patrons of the Fine Arts, for the relief of the widows and orphans of the members of the Annuity Fund. And the whole was under the direction of the president, and ten subscribers to the Benevolent Fund, annually elected by the subscribers, and five members of the Annuity Fund, annually elected by its members. Every artist proposed as a member of the Annuity Fund, had to be balloted for, and approved by the committee of the Benevolent Fund, in order to entitle his widow and children to its benefits. The benefits of this fund were extended to about 40 widows and 22 orphans, the former receiving £18, and the latter £5 annually. The income for this purpose was about £1,200 per annum, derived half from dividends, and the other half from present voluntary contributions.

John Young was honorary secretary of the Artists' Benevolent Fund from 6 December 1810 to 4 May 1813.

== See also ==
- Artists' Fund Society
- Royal Variety Charity, formerly Entertainment Artistes' Benevolent Fund
- Artists' General Benevolent Institution
