= Stevensia =

Stevensia may refer to:

- Stevensia (beetle), a genus of beetles in the family Staphylinidae
- Stevensia (plant), a genus of plants in the family Rubiaceae
