= Jack Young =

Jack Young may refer to:

== Sportsmen ==
=== Footballers ===
- Jack Young (Scottish footballer) (before 1885−after 1907), forward in Southern Football League for Bristol Rovers
- Jack Young (Gaelic footballer) (1887−1965), Irish midfielder
- Jack Young (footballer, born 1895) (1895−1952), English defender
- Jack Young (Australian rules footballer) (1908−1979), player with Carlton and Melbourne in VFL
- Jack Young (footballer, born 2000), English midfielder

=== Other sportsmen ===
- Jack Young (cricketer) (1912−1993), English right-handed batter
- Jack Young (speedway rider) (1925−1987), Australian motorcycle champion
- Jack Young (rugby union), Australian international rugby union player
- Jack Young (racing driver) (born 2001), British racing driver

== Others ==
- Jack N. Young (1926−2018), American stunt performer and film location manager
- John Hardin Young, known as Jack, American election law attorney since 1970s
- Jack Young (politician) (born 1954), American mayor of Baltimore

== See also ==
- Jackie Young (disambiguation)
- Jock Young (disambiguation)
- John Young (disambiguation)
