= Jock Young (disambiguation) =

Jock Young may refer to:

- Jock Young (deaf rights campaigner) (1926–2005), British ADA chair, OBE in 1992
- Jock Young (1942–2013), British sociologist and criminologist
- Jock Young (canoeist), British gold medalist in 1981 slalom canoeing

== See also ==
- Jack Young (disambiguation)
- Jackie Young (disambiguation)
- John Young (disambiguation)
- Yung Joc (born 1980), American rapper
