= United States and the Haitian Revolution =

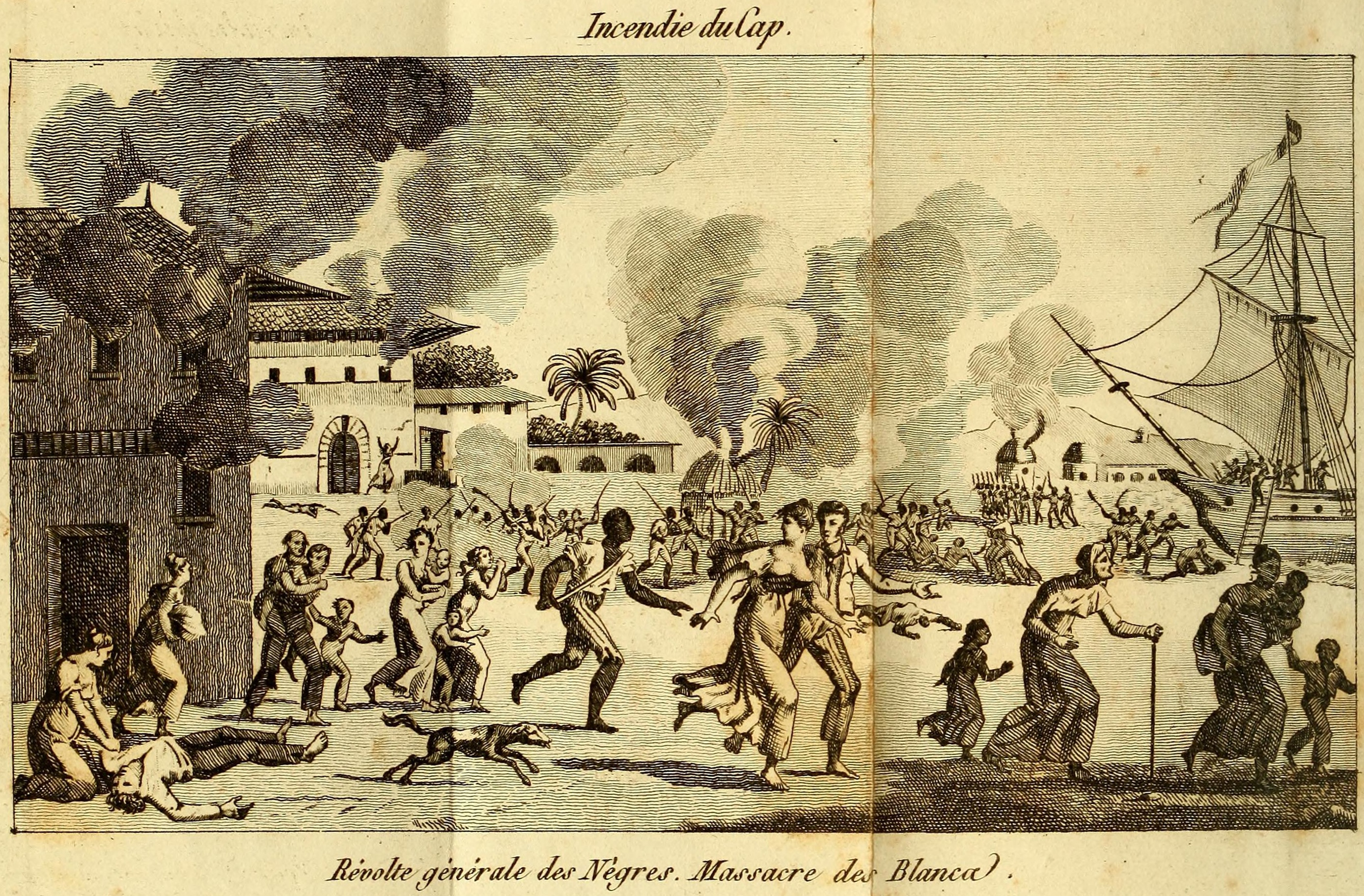
An illustration of violence during the Haitian Revolution, which lasted from 1791 to 1804

The Haitian Revolution and the subsequent independence of Haiti as an independent state provoked mixed reactions in the United States. Among many white Americans, this led to uneasiness, instilling fears of racial instability on its own soil and possible problems with foreign relations and trade between the two countries. Among enslaved African Americans, it fueled hope that the principles of the recent American Revolution might be realized in their own liberation. While the Haitian Revolution was occurring during the presidencies of George Washington and John Adams, members of the Federalist Party, including Alexander Hamilton, supported Toussaint Louverture and his revolution. Adams appointed Edward Stevens as U.S. consul-general to Haiti to forge a closer relationship between the two nations and express US support for Louverture's government.

Hamilton urged Louverture to adopt an autocratic military dictatorship with hereditary rule, as he believed ex-slaves were incapable of democratic government. Hamilton advocated for closer diplomatic and economic relations between Haiti and the United States, but warned against formal diplomatic recognition. The U.S. started to become less diplomatic to Haiti under the presidency of Thomas Jefferson. Thomas Jefferson recognized that the revolution had the potential to cause an upheaval against slavery in the US not only by slaves, but by white abolitionists as well. Southern slaveholders feared the revolt might spread from the island of Hispaniola to their own plantations. Against this background and with the declared primary goal of maintaining social order in Haiti, the US refused acknowledgement of Haitian independence until 1862.

The US also embargoed trade with the nascent state. American merchants had conducted a substantial trade with the plantations on Hispaniola throughout the 18th century, the French-ruled territory providing nearly all of its sugar and coffee. However, once the Haitian slave population emancipated itself, the US was reluctant to continue trade for fear of upsetting the evicted French on one hand and its Southern slaveholders on the other. Despite this, there were anti-slavery advocates in northern cities who believed that consistency with the principles of the American Revolution — life, liberty and equality for all — demanded that the U.S. support the Haitian people. One outcome of the Haitian Revolution for the United States was the Louisiana Purchase. Having lost his control of the Caribbean landholding, Napoleon saw no further use for Louisiana. The U.S. was only interested in the New Orleans area; however, the revolution enabled the sale of the entire territory west of the Mississippi River for around $15 million. This purchase more than doubled US territory.

== Perception of the enslaved ==
In the 1998 documentary series Africans in America: America's Journey Through Slavery Douglas R. Egerton of the Le Moyne College Department of History said,

All of the American newspapers covered events in Saint-Domingue in a great deal of detail. All Americans understood what was happening there. It wasn't that the revolution in Saint-Domingue taught mainland slaves to be rebellious or to resist their bondage. They had always done so, typically as individuals who stole themselves and ran away, sometimes in small groups, who tried to get to the frontier and build maroon colonies and rebuild African societies.

But the revolutionaries in Saint-Domingue, led by Toussaint Louverture, were not trying to pull down the power of their absentee masters, but join those masters on an equal footing in the Atlantic World. And the revolt in Haiti reminded American slaves, who were still enthusiastic about the promise of 1776, that not only could liberty be theirs if they were brave enough to try for it, but that equality with the master class might be theirs if they were brave enough to try. For black Americans, this was a terribly exciting moment, a moment of great inspiration. And for the southern planter class, it was a moment of enormous terror.

== Government policy ==
=== Under Washington and Adams ===
When the news of the 1791 slave rebellion in the French colony of Saint-Domingue reached President George Washington, he immediately sent aid to the colonial government there. In contrast, Secretary of the Treasury Alexander Hamilton and other Federalists supported Toussaint Louverture as he gradually took control of Saint-Domingue from the French. Hamilton proposed that Louverture conscript all adult men into the military and suggested that the military should enforce laws with corporal punishment. He urged Louverture to rule as an unelected dictator with total power over internal and external affairs. Legislation was to be voted on by Louverture and his generals, and the position of dictator-for-life could be handed to his children.

Hamilton and Timothy Pickering convinced John Adams to appoint Edward Stevens as the United States consul-general in Saint-Domingue, which he served as from 1799 to 1800. Adams sent Stevens to Haiti with instructions to establish a relationship with Louverture, the de facto ruler of the colony, and express support for his regime. The Federalist Adams administration hoped to encourage the colony's independence, but Louverture maintained a colonial relationship with France. Stevens's title of consul suggested a diplomat attached to a country and not a colony, reflecting the Adams administration's view of the situation in Saint-Domingue. Following his arrival in the colony in April 1799, Stevens succeeded in accomplishing several of his objectives, including suppressing the activities of privateers operating out of the colony, gaining protections for American citizens and property in Saint-Domingue and the right of entry for U.S. vessels into the colony's ports.

Stevens pushed for similar privileges for the British, who, like the United States, were at war with France. This was made difficult by the fact that Britain had occupied part of the colony from 1793 to 1798 in an attempt to capture Saint-Domingue and were also afraid of the Haitian Revolution leading to unrest among slaves in the British West Indies. Stevens had to serve as the British agent in Saint-Domingue for a period of time since local commanders were opposed to having a British official in the colony. On 13 June 1799, he signed a convention which led to an armistice among the three parties, giving protections to British and American ships from local privateers and allowing them to enter the colony and engage in free trade. Stevens's correspondence with Pickering, Adams, and Thomas Jefferson provide important insight into American geopolitics during the Haitian Revolution.

=== Under Jefferson and afterward ===
In 1791, Thomas Jefferson talked about gradual emancipation of American slaves in his private correspondence with friends while publicly remaining silent on the issue. However, by the time that the revolution was coming to an end and the debate over an embargo began, Jefferson's attitude shifted to fully avoiding the issue. Louis Andre Pichon, the chargé d’affaires of France, felt that Jefferson would help to suppress enslaved resistance in Saint-Domingue due to his fears of similar unrest in among American slaves. Jefferson had, in fact, pledged to help starve out Louverture, but due to fears of the ambitions of Napoleon, he refrained from such action. Haiti attempted to establish closer ties with the United States during the Jefferson administration, but this was difficult to do, in part because of the massacre of white French people in Haiti by Jean-Jacques Dessalines in 1804. Dessalines sent a letter to Jefferson calling for closer ties between the two nations, but Jefferson ignored the letter.

Jefferson had wanted to align with the European powers in an effort to isolate Haiti, but was unsuccessful due to Britain's lack of interest in joining the proposed accord. France pressured for the end of American trade with Haiti, which they saw as aiding a rogue element in their colony. Jefferson agreed to cease trade in arms, but would not give up trade for noncontraband goods. James Madison, commenting on the agreement to discontinue the arms trade, said that "it is probably the interest of all nations that they should be kept out of hands likely to make so bad use of them." The debate on an embargo on Haiti heated up in Congress and civil society, but it was not all one-sided. Federalist newspaper Columbian Centinel compared the Haitian Revolution with the American Revolution.

However, in Congress, the proponents of an embargo had the clear advantage. Many Southern whites thought that Jefferson's neutrality went too far and was equivalent to full-scale relations with Haiti. While such white people ignored oppression, exploitation and atrocities against enslaved Africans by white slave-traders, and by white slave-owners in Haiti and the United States (and indeed, carried out such abuses themselves), they were adamantly against reaching an agreement with people who had committed atrocities against whites, including white women and children. When George Logan introduced a bill that would outlaw all trade with Saint-Domingue that was not under French control, it signalled a shift to the side of the hard-liners. Weapons could be aboard ships only for their own protection, and any violators of the embargo would lose their cargo as well as their ships. The embargo bill introduced by George Logan was adopted in February 1806, and then renewed again the next year, until it expired in April 1808. Another embargo had been adopted in 1807 and this one lasted until 1810, though trade did not again take place until the 1820s. Despite this, official recognition did not happen until 1862, after the southern states had seceded from the US.

== Fears and racial animus of white Southerners ==
In the South, white planters viewed the revolution as a large-scale slave revolt and feared that violence in Haiti could inspire similar events in the US. Haiti had an official policy of accepting any black person who arrived on their shores as a citizen.

The legislatures of Pennsylvania and South Carolina, as well as the Washington administration, dispatched aid to French colonists in Saint-Domingue. In the debate over whether the US should embargo Haiti after it became independent, John Taylor of Virginia spoke for much of the popular sentiment of white people in the South. To him, the Haitian Revolution was evidence for the idea that "slavery should be permanent in the United States." He argued against the idea that slavery had caused the revolution, by instead suggesting that "the antislavery movement had provoked the revolt in the first place." According to historian Tim Matthewson, John Taylor's comments in the debate shows how white attitudes shifted in the south from one of reluctantly accepting slavery as a necessity, to one of seeing it as a fundamental aspect of southern culture and the slave-owning planter class. As the years progressed, Haiti only became a bigger target for scorn amongst the pro-slavery factions in the south. It was taken as proof that "violence was an inherent part of the character of blacks" due to the slaughtering of French whites, and the authoritarian rule that arose in the aftermath of the revolution.

== See also ==
- Atlantic slave trade
- Slavery in the French West Indies
- Haitian Revolution
- Haiti–United States relations
- France and the American Civil War
