= Young Brown (disambiguation) =

Young Brown or Abe Brown (born 1893) was an American welterweight boxer.

Young Brown may also refer to:

- Young Goodman Brown, Nathaniel Hawthorne story
- Young Widder Brown, NBC radio drama

== See also ==
- John Young Brown (disambiguation), several people by the name
- Young Pluto (Joseph William Dudley Brown, 1872–1931), South African boxer
- Young Buck (David Darnell Brown, born 1981), American rapper
- Little, Brown Young Readers, publishing company
- Brown-Young BY-1 airplane
- Young (disambiguation)
- Brown (disambiguation)
