= Great Southern Group =

Australian agricultural investment group

- Type: Public company
- Traded as: ASX: GTP
- Industry: Managed investment schemes
- Founded: 1987
- Defunct: 2009
- Fate: Liquidated
- Headquarters: Perth, Western Australia, Australia
- Key people: David Gould (owner), David Griffiths (chairman), Cameron Rhodes (managing director), John Young (founder and board member)
- Products: Pulpwood, Beef cattle
- Revenue: $444 million (2008)
- Net income: (loss) $63.8 million (2008)
- Number of employees: 430 (2008)

Great Southern Group was a group of Australian companies that was notable as the country's largest agribusiness managed investment scheme (MIS) business.

The company was founded in 1987 and became a public company in 1999. It expanded its MIS business rapidly in the 2000s, supported by favourable tax regulations for these types of investments. Most of the Group's business was in plantation forestry to supply woodchips for the pulp and paper industry, but in the 2000s it diversified into high-value timbers, beef cattle, olives, viticulture, and almond production. The company's after-tax profit peaked at $132 million in 2006, but by 2008 had deteriorated to a $63 million loss.

The Great Southern companies attracted debate and criticism associated with the operation of managed investment schemes generally, and the environmental performance of their Tiwi Islands operation in particular. On 16 May 2009, as a result of worsening economic conditions and regulatory issues, the GSL, GSMAL, GSF and other subsidiaries of GSL entered into voluntary administration. Ferrier Hodgson was assigned as liquidator of Great Southern Group. The collapse of Great Southern Group, in conjunction with the failure of another high-profile agribusiness company, Timbercorp, led to three separate Australian parliamentary committee inquiries into the MIS industry.

== History ==
=== Rise ===
Percentage of Great Southern's Managed Investment Scheme sales by product 2004—2008
1. Pulpwood (64.0%)
2. High value timber (8.00%)
3. Cattle (9.00%)
4. Olives (10.0%)
5. Wine grapes (8.00%)
6. Almonds (1.00%)

The Great Southern Group began as the company Great Southern, co-founded in 1987 by accountant John Carlton Young, and microbiologist Helen Sewell. It began by managing South-east Australian plantations of Pinus radiata, but in 1992 shifted to Eucalyptus plantations for woodchip production, dealing in blue gum woodlot investments. Through the 1990s it developed its plantation business in south western Western Australia including the Great Southern region (after which the company is named), leasing woodlots to investors on land owned by Great Southern. A related entity, Templegate Finance Pty Ltd, would also lend finance to investors.

Young was Great Southern's Executive chairman when it listed on the Australian Securities Exchange in 1999, and co-founder Sewell remained in a full-time role until her retirement in February 2001. When the ASX200, a new stock exchange index comprising the top 200 Australian companies by market capitalisation and liquidity, was instituted in March 2000, Great Southern was one of the stocks included.

By 2001, the Group had 66 000 hectares of forestry plantations in New South Wales, Queensland, Victoria and Western Australia. Its performance on the share market was strong enough that it was Shares magazine's number one ranked stock in its table of top 50 stocks by yield in January 2002. However the business faced some turbulent times, with profits in 2001 and 2002 down on the levels of 2000. The company was delisted from the ASX200 for a period (from October 2002 to August 2003), although it was relisted and remained in the index until December 2008.

In 2004, the Group diversified into viticulture, planting vines in Western Australia. The company reported that it had been the ASX200's fourth-best performer in 2004, and second-best performer over the preceding two years. In November 2004, Young indicated to the company's annual meeting that harvesting of the first plantations had now commenced, and forecast further MIS sales growth. The shares in Great Southern peaked at $4.76 at this time, and Young sold a significant proportion of his shareholding, netting him $32.6 million.

In 2005 Great Southern expanded into organic olives, acquired some existing beef cattle MIS businesses, and bought forest products company Sylvatech, including its $700 million of assets. The purchase of Sylvatech meant the company now also had forestry plantations in the Northern Territory, on the Tiwi Islands.

Great Southern's cattle properties included the 660,000-hectare Moola Bulla property in WA's East Kimberley region, the similar sized Wrotham Park, 300 kilometres west of Cairns, and the 196,000-hectare blue-ribbon station of Chudleigh Park near Townsville", as well as a further 2.4 million hectares of pastoral leasehold. In 2007, the company also diversified its MIS offerings to high value timbers, such as mahogany, the uses for which included furniture and flooring. The following table outlines the expansion of the Great Southern Group's operations.

Great Southern's land and cattle holdings
	1999	2000	2001	2002	2003	2004	2005	2006	2007	2008
Plantation land holdings (ha) (Note: These figures are for total plantation land holdings, which are separate (and higher) areas than for hectares of actual plantation under management. Area for 1999 represents land holding for 2000 less land acquisitions for 2000)	29,238	47,774	66,894	67,012	70,329	174,859	200,516	235,000	240,000	240,000
Head of cattle	NA	NA	NA	NA	NA	NA	NA	167,134	176,544	149,935
Horticulture (ha) (Note: For 2004 & 2005: sum of area of grape vines and olive groves.)	NA	NA	NA	NA	NA	185	793	3,986	4,537	5,093

=== Fall ===
In the mid-2000s, Great Southern's business was growing rapidly, with sales and market capitalisation increasing at more than 100 per cent per annum. However, in its 2005 Annual Report, the company disclosed that it was subsidising the returns to its 1994 forestry scheme by approximately $3 million, and that it expected to have to similarly subsidise the 1995 and 1996 schemes by up to $12 million in future years. Board chairman Peter Patrikeos and non-executive director Jeffry Mews both expressed concern about the way in which Great Southern was funding shortfalls on the sales of timber products, with the issue leading directly to Mews' resignation. Although the company continued to sell over $800 million of MIS products in the two financial years after incurring losses on its early offerings, it was not meeting sales targets, and its share price was falling.

Underpinning Great Southern's decision to subsidise returns to its early investors was a looming problem: its forestry plantations were not performing to expectations. Timber yields were poorer than had been projected. Great Southern's baseline projection had been 250 tonnes of woodchips per hectare, but an assessment in 2003 suggested that in most plantations yield would be reduced: in some cases to less than half the planned figure. The company itself considered that yields were proving to be "disappointing", with actual yields for the woodlots planted in the period between 1994 and 1997 (and thus harvested by 2008) being between 120 and 200 tonnes per hectare. Plantation growth had been limited by drought conditions and issues with the site and seedling quality of early plantings.

The company's sales of MIS schemes, and its profits, both peaked in 2006, with over $450 million in sales, and a net profit after tax of $133 million. However, the 2006 harvest (of 1996 plantations) yielded a return of only $1,500 and $1,750 for the woodlots that investors had bought for $3,000. These plantations had not been productive enough to yield a profit for investors, so Great Southern inflated the returns to $4,100 using its own funds.

In December 2007 Young announced he would step down as managing director, remaining as both non-executive director and major shareholder. Saying that he wanted someone younger to implement the company's five-year business plans, he handed over to Cameron Rhodes, one of Great Southern's existing senior management team.

Revenue and profit (in A$ thousands)
	1998	1999	2000	2001	2002	2003	2004	2005	2006	2007	2008
MIS sales	37,122	56,418	76,503	42,174	55,299	108,654	242,932	355,368	456,906	412,000	314,000
Operating revenue	34,520	49,756	94,483	63,052	54,571	99,449	208,344	318,849	499,511		
Profit (loss) before tax	23,631	33,540	59,081	33,186	24,726	59,485	132,716	175,552	192,989	99,600	(67,694)
Profit (loss) after tax	18,805	22,129	38,295	21,921	17,215	41,397	93,226	124,307	132,859	71,508	(63,804)

In 2008, Great Southern had over 430 employees managing investment schemes on behalf of over 47 000 investors. Industry sectors in which investment occurred included beef cattle, forestry, wine grapes, almonds, and poultry production. Its plantation estate had grown to 179 000 hectares, the vast majority of which was for wood pulp production.

As MIS sales declined from their 2006 peak, the Group's debt levels rose. By October 2008, business analysts Austock Securities were describing the company as "excessively geared". The Group developed a proposal, known as Project Transform, to restructure the business, in particular through seeking the agreement of investors to swap their MIS investments for shares in Great Southern Limited. The intention was to free up capital to reduce debt, and make the business more attractive to investors. Analysts such as Austock Securities and Macquarie Research Equities supported the strategy.

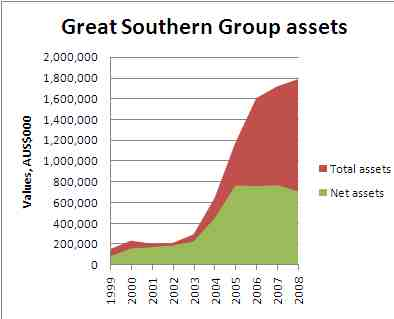
Great Southern Group's assets. Net assets were ultimately limited by the company's "unsustainable levels" of debt.

The company reported a $64 million loss in its 2008 financial year. By 2009, the global economic downturn, and regulatory uncertainty associated with MIS schemes, was putting the company under financial pressure, and it was seeking to improve its situation both through asset sales and refinancing of debt. Its debt levels had risen significantly: it had extended its debt financing with its banks from $245 million to $350 million in 2007. By September 2008 its total debt had ballooned to $820 million, of which $376 million was owed to its lead bankers, ANZ, Commonwealth Bank, Bankwest and Mizuho. Great Southern had also been hoping to see a rise in the price obtained for its woodchips, but was unsuccessful in its 2009 negotiations with Japanese customers.

By early 2009, business analysts Lonsec Agribusiness Research considered Great Southern to be financially stressed, and that it was "hard to envisage a rapid turnaround in the outlook" for the company. They gave Great Southern as managers the second-lowest rating on their assessment scale, just short of stating that the investment would be "detrimental to an investor's...portfolio". Great Southern's banks refused a request in 2009 for a further $35 million loan. Great Southern's attempts to extract itself from financial trouble were unsuccessful and by May 2009, when a trading halt was called, the company's shares were worth just 12 cents. On 16 May 2009 administrators were appointed under the Corporations Act 2001, with the companies' assets passing into control of receivers McGrathNicol on 18 May 2009. The assets of the group were primarily its land holdings. By the time it went into administration, they were valued at $1.8 billion, however, despite company expansion plans, its net assets had not grown for four years.

In July 2009 the receivers determined that the company was insolvent. With a complex business structure to unravel, some commentators expect it may take years for the company's collapse to be fully resolved. By April 2010, timber company Gunns had taken over as the responsible entity running most of Great Southern's pulpwood schemes, but the land on which they were being grown was yet to be sold.

Following its collapse, there was some speculation about whether Great Southern had disclosed to the market issues with the rate of return it was going to achieve on some of its timber investments. During parliamentary committee inquiries, these allegations were extended to the possibility that the auditors had been misled. It was also noted that, at the time that difficulties were emerging for Great Southern, its CEO sold some of his shares at the top of the companies' fortunes for $32.6 million.

One of Australia's other leading managed investment scheme companies, Timbercorp, had also gone into administration the previous month. The two corporate collapses prompted examination by three separate Parliamentary committee inquiries: the first by the Parliamentary Joint Committee on Corporations and Financial Services, into Agribusiness Managed Investment Schemes, which reported in September 2009; the second by the Senate Select Committee on Agricultural and Related Industries; and the third by the Senate Economics References Committee, " Agribusiness managed investment schemes – Bitter harvest"; published on 11 March 2016.

In 2012, over 22,000 of Great Southern's investors commenced civil action suing for damages, claiming they had been misled by the company.

== Business activities ==
The Great Southern Group in 2008 formed Australia's largest managed agribusiness investment scheme operation. The company comprised a parent entity, Great Southern Plantations Limited (from 2007 renamed Great Southern Limited), and over forty subsidiaries, almost all wholly owned. Those subsidiaries held or operated Great Southern's businesses, including providing management services.

At the centre of Great Southern's operations were management investment schemes (referred to as MIS schemes). MIS schemes are a mechanism by which investors' funds are pooled to invest in a common business enterprise. A "responsible entity" (such as Great Southern) controls the routine administration of the investments. In primary production schemes such as those managed by Great Southern, investors are the growers of products (such as forestry plantations), with an agreement with the company to manage the investment "to plant, establish and maintain the trees until they are harvested at maturity". Investors in Great Southern generally purchased lots (typically of 1 hectare) on land owned or leased by Great Southern. Thus investors owned the plantations, but the land assets belonged to the company. While investors owned individual woodlots, risks and returns were distributed across all investors in individual projects, with growers sharing "the average yield at harvest for the entire Project...rather than the return from their individual woodlot". These were not high rates of return for the length of investment involved. Some of the schemes relied upon the rationale that investors would retire and therefore receive income from the scheme when their marginal tax rate was lower than at the time of initial investment. Based on this premise some schemes were claiming a rate of return after tax of eight to nine percent. Others suggested the schemes were a poor investment likely to achieve only six percent return.

Returns to investors comprised a tax deduction in the year in which they bought the products, and returns from the sale of produce over the life of the project, which was typically at the point of harvest 10–12 years later for plantations, "and up to 23 years for horticultural projects such as almonds". Great Southern would deduct management fees from the final sale value. A typical forestry investment in the early 2000s involved an initial payment of $3,000 for one-third of a hectare woodlot, yielding a $2,900 tax deduction at that time. Returns on harvesting depended on many variables; Great Southern forecast that investors would recoup their original investment and a further return of between $1923 and $4569 per woodlot, however early schemes did not achieve these figures on the basis of the timber sales, with some resulting in woodchip sales of only around $1,500, half the value of what was originally invested. Investors received their returns when the product (usually woodchip) was harvested and sold.

While the majority of Great Southern's activity was in the sale of managed investment schemes, in 2007 it diversified into funds management through the purchase of Rural Funds Management Ltd, retaining its diversified agricultural assets fund and offering a new share fund and a blended property fund. In addition to retailing MIS products to investors, Great Southern also provided loans to investors wanting to borrow to invest. By 2009 its loan book comprised 14,500 loans with an average value of approximately $50,000.

== Great Southern and the regulation of managed investment schemes (MIS) ==
Great Southern and its nearest industry rival Timbercorp were estimated as having 43 per cent of all managed investment schemes (MIS) business in Australia. In contrast to other MIS industry participants, for which MIS activity is only a small part of their operations, managed investment schemes were 100 per cent of Great Southern Group and Timbercorp's business.

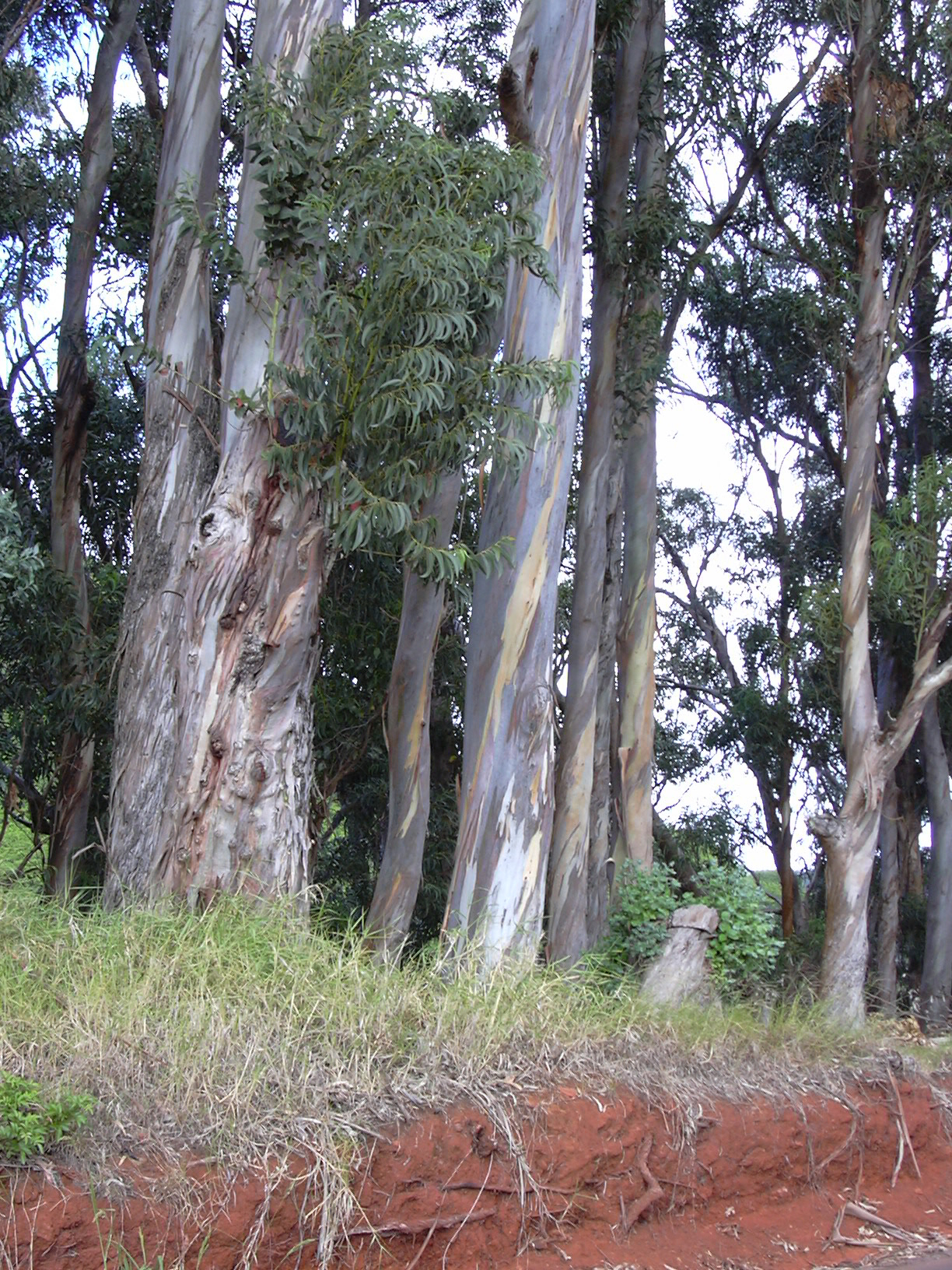
Eucalyptus globulus, the main plantation species grown by Great Southern in Victoria. Image: Forest & Kim Starr

Agribusiness MISs offer certain advantages to investors, dispersing investment risks across a large pool of investors and, through tax concessions, sharing those risks between the private investor and the taxpayer. The schemes were intended to overcome failures in the market for risk, and in the area of forestry reflect the fact that Australia has always subsidised plantation development.

MIS schemes however have a long history of criticism. Reports from the Rural Industries Research and Development Corporation (RIRDC) in 2000 and 2004 were reported to have found the schemes performed relatively poorly, in one case relating an analysis "of schemes offered to the public in 2002–03 [that] found that less than 10 per cent were sufficiently sound investments to warrant their recommendation". In 2006, another RIRDC report in 2006 observed:

Along with other studies, our analysis suggests that the MIS sector (but not all MIS) continues to

perform poorly with respect to realistic or actual rates of return versus marketed rates. There are limited rights for investors. Issues arising from the large number and small economic size of the retail

investor population and those arising from asymmetric information dominate the economics of MIS.

The Australian Securities & Investments Commission (ASIC) was also reported to have identified issues with inadequate disclosure of information to potential investors, poor performance of the investments, and high management fees for agricultural MIS schemes. In 2003, the commission commented that it "has deployed a disproportionate percentage of its resources to the regulation of this sector, which represents only a minority of funds under management". In 2010 it commenced revision of disclosure rules, prompted by "recent turmoil in the agribusiness scheme sector".

The Great Southern Group relied significantly on financial planners and accountants recommending their MIS products to investors. The company was paying commissions of ten percent – high by industry standards, and similar to those paid by other failed investment businesses including Westpoint Corporation and Storm Financial. It was also spending a lot of money on recruiting financial advisers to sell its products. One report indicated that $137 million was spent on "commissions, marketing and promotion in two years to 2008". Some accountants, with Great Southern's support, were recommending the agribusiness investment schemes, though they did not have a financial services licence; one report suggested over half of Great Southern's MIS sales were coming through accountants, often tax specialists from small practices. These practices had been questioned for several years by the corporate regulator ASIC and some market analysts, and were widely criticised following Great Southern's collapse. Some experts were critical of the lack of knowledge and expertise of the investment advisers recommending agroforestry MIS schemes.

=== Taxation treatment of MIS schemes ===
Crucial to the attractiveness to investors of all MIS schemes is their taxation treatment. The Australian government had for many years been encouraging agricultural and forestry investment schemes by allowing investors to claim up-front tax deductions of the costs of investment. Investors paid Great Southern a fee to lease plantation woodlots. Great Southern managed the woodlot, and the investor could deduct the cost of the lease from the income they declared that year for tax assessment purposes. The tax deductible status of the investment was widely regarded as the main attraction of MIS schemes to investors.

The tax-driven nature of investment in the sector made it vulnerable to policy changes and court rulings interpreting tax law. Tax law reforms in the late 1990s resulting from a major review of tax policy (called the Ralph review) altered the way in which deductions could be claimed. These changes, together with company profit warnings, caused a decline in Great Southern's share price and its business prospects in 2000 and 2001. Although Great Southern survived the reforms, another company, Australian Plantation Timber, was driven into administration. In June 2001 a Senate committee report was critical of Australian Taxation Office (ATO) advice on forestry investments, and the ATO released a statement reassuring forest product investors that they had investment certainty. MIS schemes recovered in 2002, despite a further Senate Committee report critical of mass-marketed investment schemes, that recommended "that the government seek advice from both ASIC and the ACCC on the question of the adequacy of the current measures for monitoring the schemes market, with particular reference to agribusiness and franchise schemes".

Throughout the mid-2000s, MIS schemes, including those of Great Southern, attracted increasing investment, driven by tax advantages. Tax benefits for investors that had been due to expire in June 2006 were extended in the Howard government's 2005 budget to June 2008, and Great Southern was one of the beneficiaries of the decision. Nevertheless, although Great Southern's business had continued to grow, the sector was unhappy about taxation uncertainty. The government moved to address this in 2007, through the Tax Laws Amendment (2007 Measures No.3) Bill 2007. Forest industry peak bodies, the National Association of Forest Industries, Tree Plantations Australia, Treefarm Investment Managers Australia and the Australian Plantation Products and Paper Industry Council jointly supported the legislation, saying it would end "ten years of instability and uncertainty about the future ongoing taxation arrangements for retail forestry projects". Nevertheless, the bill attracted heated debate in the Parliament, and did not end taxation issues in the sector.

In 2007, the ATO moved to end the up-front tax deductions for non-forestry MIS investments. This announcement was a disappointment to Great Southern, although only 30 per cent of its business at that stage was non-forestry MIS that would be affected by the ATO ruling. The ATO's ruling was overturned in 2008, however it had created significant investor and lender uncertainty.

== Great Southern and Australian politics ==
Because Great Southern was involved in a controversial industry, it figured in policy debates throughout its life as a publicly listed company. At the centre of Great Southern's business was the development of new forest estates for commercial harvest. Australia's state and federal governments had agreed in 1992 to a National Forest Policy Statement, which included the goal of expanding Australia's plantation forests. On this foundation, in July 1996, the federal forests minister and his state and territory counterparts met and "endorsed the plantation industry's target of trebling the plantation estate from 1.1 million hectares to 3 million hectares by the year 2020". In October 1997 governments, the Australian Plantation Products and Paper Industry Council, the Australian Forest Growers, and the National Association of Forest Industries, jointly released Plantations for Australia: The 2020 Vision, known as "Plantations 2020".

The federal minister for forests from 1998 to 2001, Wilson Tuckey, was a strong advocate of Plantations 2020. He also held the federal seat of O'Connor in Western Australia, which included much of the Great Southern region and significant areas of plantation forests. Tuckey and the forest industry had a close relationship, to the extent that the industry paid for newspaper advertisements that reproduced a letter from Tuckey, following critical coverage of forestry MIS schemes in the media. Great Southern also reproduced Tuckey's letter in their 2000 Annual Report.

During the 2004 election year, Great Southern gave $20,000 to each of the governing Liberal and National parties, as well as to the Labor opposition. In the lead up to the 2007 federal election, Great Southern made $40,000 of donations to the Labor opposition, including $10,000 two days after the release of the party's primary industries policy. After Labor won the election, Great Southern's managing director John Young spoke positively of the change in government and of Labor's willingness to review policy toward managed investment schemes.

== Environmental and land use issues ==
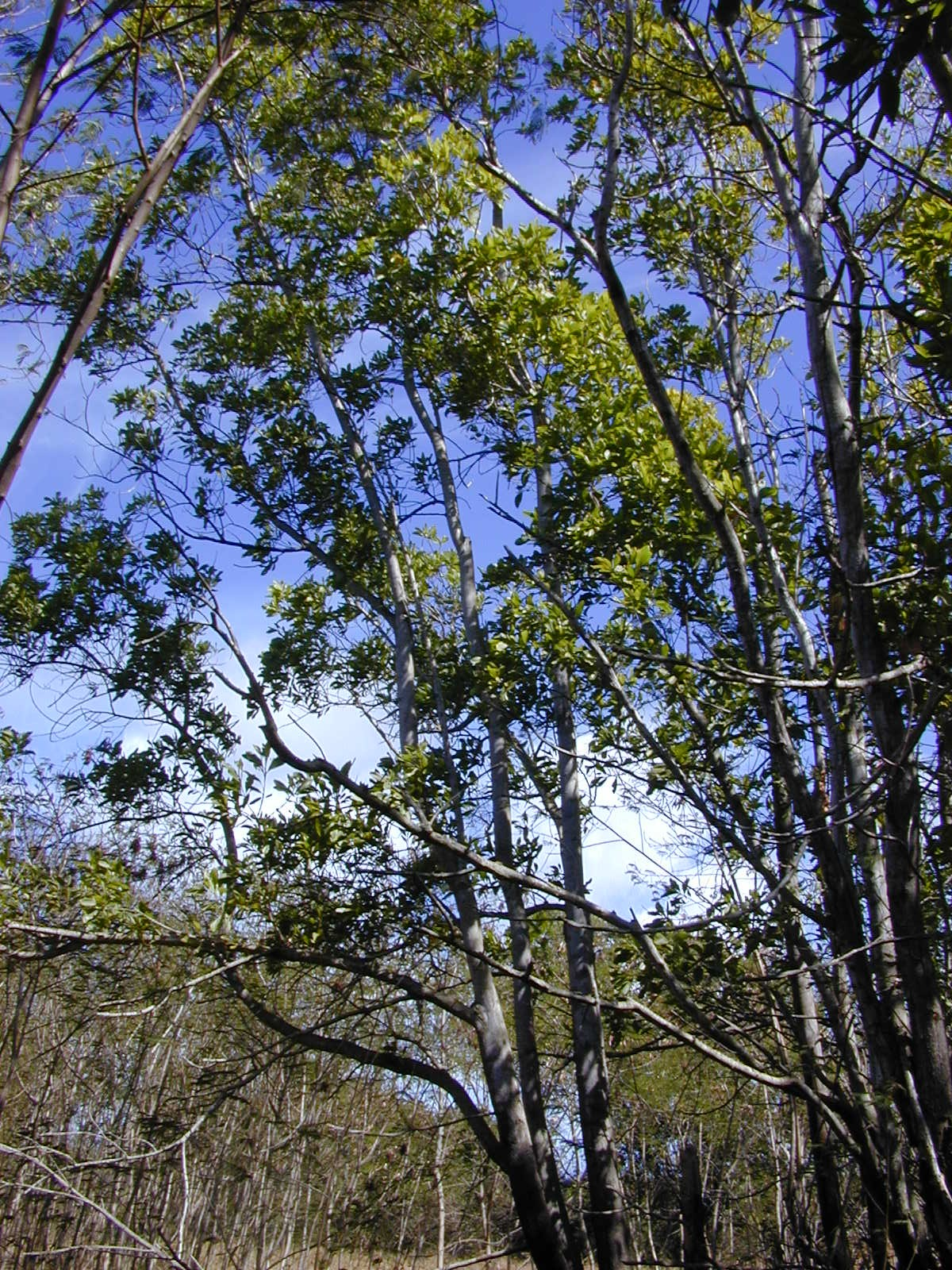
Acacia mangium, Great Southern's plantation species on the Tiwi Islands. Image: Forest & Kim Starr

In acquiring the Acacia mangium plantations of Sylvatech on the Tiwi Islands, Great Southern Group had taken on responsibility for an investment that, while supported by the local Tiwi Land Council, was opposed by environmental non-government organisations (NGOs) and some individuals on the Tiwi Islands. The concerns expressed by NGOs related to loss of biodiversity and to greenhouse gas emissions.

Complaints were made that Great Southern Group's 2005 acquisition, Sylvatech, was conducting clearing and plantation activities in breach of environmental conditions set by the Commonwealth Department of the Environment, Water, Heritage and the Arts. These complaints led to a departmental investigation and an agreement between the company and the government that recognised there had been inadvertent breaches of environmental conditions by the company, where forestry operations had intruded into zones designed to protect sensitive rainforests and wetland areas. The company was required to "fix all incursions into the rainforest and wetland buffers", post a A$1 million bond to ensure the works were completed, and provide A$1.35 million over three years toward the Tiwi Land Council's Indigenous Rangers Program, a group of Indigenous land management staff funded by the Tiwi Land Council and Great Southern to conduct environmental works, including weed management and monitoring threatened species.

There had been criticism of MIS companies generally, and Great Southern Group (as the largest company in the sector) in particular, suggesting that their appetite for land for plantations and agribusiness was driving up land prices in some regions, and distorting some commodity markets. In 2004, Great Southern's leading competitor Timbercorp reported a rise in plantation land prices from around $3,000 to around $6,000 per hectare in just five years. The high demand for forestry MIS schemes led to plantations being expanded on to less suitable land, with timber growth and yield then falling below projections that were based on better quality plantations. Some farmers claimed that MIS were driving up prices in agricultural water markets. Opinion was also divided about whether the expansion of MIS properties in a region was causing shrinkage of towns or was, conversely, stimulating employment.

== Analysing the Group's failure ==
Analysis of the MIS failures of Great Southern Group and Timbercorp focused on several factors. First, critics argued that some MIS investments resembled Ponzi schemes, where securing financial returns for existing investors relied on attracting new investors rather than on successful economic activity. Second, Great Southern Group's rapid expansion had been underpinned by high levels of debt, and in difficult economic circumstances in which new investment was diminishing and new borrowings were hard to obtain, that debt could not successfully be serviced. Third, some experts and Great Southern Group itself expressed concern that investor uncertainty caused by ATO rulings, and fuelled by reporting of taxation policy issues, had scared investors away from their MIS. This was a view that the Australian Taxation Office rejected, arguing that the administrators of both Timbercorp and Great Southern had not identified taxation uncertainty as an issue. Finally, a range of commentators considered that the MIS tax concessions were encouraging unsustainable business models, with companies focusing on selling the tax benefits of investments rather than focussing on profitable commodity production. This, it was argued, led them to underestimate business risks, overinflate land prices, and sell products at lower-than-optimal prices. The failure of MIS schemes for these reasons was predicted in 2008 by Ajani, who argued that "we know that investment driven by the demand for tax minimisation, and not market realities, is associated with collapse".

The Australian Financial Review (AFR) had for years carried stories critical of managed investment schemes. An AFR story had prompted the letter, supporting the forest industries, from federal government minister Wilson Tuckey in 2000. When Great Southern collapsed, Tuckey was asked for comment by the Sydney Morning Herald. He said "Everyone thought [a plantation strategy] was a good idea at the time". He argued investors would probably not lose their money, but "shareholders and lenders could be in a bit of trouble". With both Great Southern Group and Timbercorp under administration, the AFR continued its editorial attack on government MIS policy. An AFR journalist wrote, "as a general rule, MIS industries are inherently doomed to fail both from an investment and a social good perspective ... Taxpayers should ... not be surprised that they continue to fall over".

== Great Southern Class Action ==
In May 2011 more than 2,000 of the estimated 8,000 investors who lost money in the collapse of GSL took legal action seeking damages from Great Southern. They said the company did not disclose the risks associated with managed investment schemes and the company's poor financial performance. The action also sought to question Bendigo & Adelaide Bank, Javelin Asset Management and Great Southern Finance as to why they issued loans to investors in Great Southern.

The $23 million settlement, flagged in July, resolves a class action by 2000 investors led by Macpherson and Kelley Lawyers and targeting Bendigo & Adelaide Bank's involvement in Great Southern's schemes.

The class action had sought to void more than $300 million of loans taken out with Bendigo and Javelin Asset Management to fund the schemes on the basis that investors were misled by Great Southern, which collapsed five years ago.

The deed of settlement, however, confirms the loans are valid and enforceable, while waiving accrued penalty interest on overdue borrowings.

About $20 million of the $23 million will be paid to Macpherson and Kelley Lawyers to cover its costs, with just $3 million to be distributed among tens of thousands of investors who sunk nearly $2 billion into Great Southern.

== Bibliography ==
- Austock Securities (31 October 2008), Great Southern (GTP)...to a significant land and forestry play
- Great Southern (2000), Annual Report 2000 (part 1); (part 3). Retrieved 2009-09-03.
- Great Southern (2001), Annual Report 2001 (part 1); (part 3). Retrieved 2009-09-03.
- Great Southern (2002), Annual Report 2002 (part 1); (part 3). Retrieved 2009-09-03.
- Great Southern (2003), Annual Report 2003 (part 1); (part 3). Retrieved 2009-09-03.
- Great Southern (2004), Annual Report 2004 (part 1); (part 3). Retrieved 2009-09-03.
- Great Southern (2005), Annual Report 2005 (part 1); (part 3). Retrieved 2009-09-03.
- Great Southern (2006), Annual Report 2006 (part 1); (part 3). Retrieved 2009-09-03.
- Great Southern (2007), Annual Report 2007
- Great Southern (2008), Annual Report 2008]
- Underwood, Roger (2007), "Assessing 'managed investment scheme' forestry projects: A best-practice template for commercial plantation development'", Australian Forestry, 70 (4): 269–274, doi:10.1080/00049158.2007.10675029, S2CID 154605578
