= Jonathan Young =

Jonathan Young, Jonathon Young, or Johnathan Young may refer to:

- Jonathan Young (commodore) (1826–1885), United States Navy commodore
- Jonathan Young (politician) (born 1958), member of the New Zealand House of Representatives
- Jonathan Young (psychologist) (born 1944), American psychologist and mythographer
- Jonathan Young (Survivor contestant) (born 1993), American reality television contestant
- Jonathon Young (born 1973), Canadian actor

== See also ==
- John Young (disambiguation)
- Johnny Young (disambiguation)
