= Timbercorp =

Australian managed investment scheme

Timbercorp Limited
- Formerly: Timbercorp Eucalypts Limited (1999)
- Type: Public
- Traded as: ASX: TIM
- Industry: Managed investment scheme
- Founded: 1999
- Headquarters: Melbourne, Victoria, Australia
- Products: Pulpwood; Olives; Avocados; Almonds
- Website: www.timbercorp.com.au at the Wayback Machine (archived April 17, 2009)

Timbercorp, a now-defunct managed investment scheme within Australia from 1999 to 2008, was established to manage superannuation and investments in agriculture. The consortium of companies were placed into public administration on 23 April 2009 and is currently being wound up by administrators.

Over 40 businesses were operated by Timbercorp, including silviculture, pulpwood timber, avocados, olives, almonds and other agribusiness schemes.

== History ==
The Timbercorp Group was founded in 1992 when it was first incorporated as Timbercorp Eucalypts Limited. The Company later changed its name to Timbercorp Limited which was listed on the Australian Stock Exchange in 1996. In 2004, the company increased profits by 50% and Timbercorp's share price went up 48%. On 8 February 2007, shares in Timbercorp dived 28% after the government abolished tax relief on non-forestry managed investment schemes. At the time 15,000 hectares of olive, almond, citrus, mango and avocado orchards were managed by Timbercorp.

== Government review of managed investment schemes ==
Being one of Australia's leading managed investment scheme companies during 2004–2007, the decision to enter administration took place one month before another leading managed investment company, Great Southern Group also failed. The joint failure of both these enterprises took place in 2009 and caused the federal government to review the operation of managed investment schemes, resulting in alterations to the operation of these which were announced in 2011.

When in 2014 the Australian government considered reforms that would relax restrictions on investment advice, the Timbercorp case was cited by opponents of the changes as evidence of why the tighter rules were needed.

== See also ==
- Economy of Australia
