= John Young Brown =

John Young Brown may refer to:

== Politics ==
- John Y. Brown (politician, born 1835) (1835–1904), United States representative from Kentucky and Governor of Kentucky from 1891 to 1895
- John Y. Brown Sr. (1900–1985), United States representative from Kentucky
- John Y. Brown Jr. (1933–2022), Governor of Kentucky from 1979 to 1983
- John Young Brown III (born 1963), Secretary of State of Kentucky from 1996 to 2004

== Others ==
- John Brown (basketball, born 1951), American basketball player

== See also ==
- John Brown (disambiguation)
- John Young (disambiguation)
- Young Brown (disambiguation)
- John (disambiguation)
- Young (disambiguation)
- Brown (disambiguation)
