= Edward Stevens (diplomat) =

Antiguan-born physician and diplomat

Edward Stevens, FRSE (21 February 1754 – 26 September 1834) was an Antiguan-born medical doctor and diplomat. A close friend of American statesman Alexander Hamilton, Stevens played a major role in the American response to the Haitian Revolution.

== Early life ==
Stevens was born in Antigua on 21 February 1754. Stevens's father, a Scottish merchant named Thomas Stevens who was the landlord of Rachel Fawcette, Hamilton's mother, would later become the adoptive father of the orphaned Alexander Hamilton. Stevens was one of five children. He quickly became good friends with his adopted brother Hamilton, displaying many similar mannerisms. Both were interested in classics, medicine, and spoke the French language fluently.

Contemporaries would often remark that Edward Stevens and Hamilton looked very much alike. Secretary of State Timothy Pickering, who knew both men in adulthood, noted that the men were strikingly similar in appearance and concluded that they must be biological brothers. Hamilton biographer Ron Chernow says many aspects of Hamilton's biography make more sense given Stevens's paternity. It would explain why Hamilton was adopted into the Stevens family while his older brother, James, apparently was not. It may have also been a factor in Hamilton's acknowledged father abandoning his family. However, this speculation, mostly based on Pickering's comments on the resemblance between the two men, has always been vague and unsupported. Rachel Faucette had been living on St. Kitts and Nevis for years at the time when Alexander was conceived, while Thomas Stevens lived on Antigua and St. Croix and James Hamilton Sr never disavowed his paternity, signing his letters to Alexander even in later years ”your very affectionate Father”. Moreover, William Cissel historian and N.P.S. Christiansted Historic Site Director did find possible evidence that Thomas Stevens did initially take both Hamilton boys in, not just Alexander, as in 1769 the registers read that the household had two “white male servants” that hadn't been listed before. By the 1772 register the “white male servants” are gone: Hamilton may have been upgraded and James Jr., who was by then 19 years old, had gone to live elsewhere.

Stevens graduated from King's College in 1774 and then sailed to Britain to study Medicine at the University of Edinburgh. He gained his Doctor of Medicine doctorate on 12 September 1777. Stevens' dissertation on gastric digestion was entitled De alimentorum concoctione. Based on this work, he was the first researcher to isolate human gastric juices. His work confirmed that of René Antoine Ferchault de Réaumur, who showed the digestive power of gastric juices, and helped dispel earlier theories of digestion. Stevens's work on digestion would influence Lazzaro Spallanzani.

== Medical & Scientific Career ==
On 20 January 1776, Stevens was admitted to the university's Royal Medical Society. He served as the Society's president for the academic year 1779/1780. Stevens conducted experimental inquiry into the color of blood and received a prize for his work. Stevens remained in Edinburgh until 1783 and was one of the joint founders of the Royal Society of Edinburgh in that year.

Stevens returned to St. Croix in 1783. He worked there as a physician for ten years. He maintained his friendship with Hamilton through correspondence. In adulthood, Hamilton tended to shun his turbulent adolescence, and Stevens was the only person from his childhood, including even his closest living family members, with whom he kept in regular contact. Following the death of his wife, Eleanora, in 1792, Stevens decided to move to North America. Stevens had considered a move to Guyana, but William Thornton urged him to choose the United States. Also in 1792, Stevens married Hester Kortright Amory. Stevens ended his ten years of practicing medicine in the Caribbean and moved to Philadelphia in 1793. While in Philadelphia, he engaged in a controversy with Benjamin Rush on methods for treating an outbreak of yellow fever. Alexander Hamilton and his wife Eliza contracted the disease, and Stevens treated them with bark, wine, and cold baths, a regimen that stirred some controversy since Stevens spurned the bloodletting treatment advocated by most doctors including Rush. Upon his recovery, Hamilton became an advocate for Stevens's method. Stevens was admitted to the American Philosophical Society on 18 April 1794. Stevens's work in digestion may have influenced other researchers in Philadelphia, notably John Richardson Young. In 1795, Stevens was appointed as a professor at the then-renamed Columbia College.

== Government Service ==
On February 16, 1799, President John Adams appointed Stevens to serve as the United States consul-general in the French colony of Saint-Domingue (modern-day Haiti). Stevens served from 1799 to 1801, during the period when Toussaint Louverture consolidated his rule over the island. John Adams sent Stevens to Saint-Domingue with instructions to establish a relationship with Louverture, gain commercial advantages for the United States, and materially support Louverture's regime during his War of the South. The Federalist Adams administration hoped to encourage the colony's independence, but Louverture maintained the colonial suzerainty of France. Stevens's title of consul-general suggested a diplomat attached to a country and not a colony, reflecting the Adams administration's view of the situation in Saint-Domingue. Following his arrival in the colony in April 1799, Stevens succeeded in accomplishing several of his objectives, including suppressing the activities of privateers operating out of the colony, gaining protections for American citizens and property in Saint-Domingue and the right of entry for U.S. vessels into the colony's ports.

Additionally, Stevens informally served as the British agent in Saint-Domingue for a period of time because local commanders, particularly the Governor of Jamaica, were opposed to having a British official in the colony. Stevens pushed for similar privileges for the British, who, like the United States were at war with France. This was made difficult by the fact that Britain had occupied part of the colony from 1793 to 1798 in an attempt to capture Saint-Domingue and were also afraid of the Haitian Revolution leading to unrest among slaves in the British West Indies. On 13 June 1799, Stevens signed a convention which led to an armistice among the three parties, granting protections and most favored nation trading relationship to British and American ships. Stevens worked in unison with the U.S. Navy's West Indies Squadron to assist Louverture against his sole remaining rival, Andre Rigaud, while avoiding as much direct confrontation with other French authorities as possible. His correspondence with Pickering, Adams, and Thomas Jefferson provide important insight into American geopolitics during the Haitian Revolution.

In 1802, French botanist Pierre Antoine Poiteau named Stevensia, a genus of flowering plants from Haiti and the Dominican Republic which belong to the Rubiaceae family, in Stevens's honour.

== Later life ==
Little is known of Stevens's last years. From 19 December 1809 to 3 March 1810, he served as the President of Saint Croix when it was under British occupation. He corresponded with David Hosack, including a letter introducing his son in 1823.

== Sources ==
- Bender, Thomas (2006). A nation among nations : America's place in world history. New York: Hill and Wang. ISBN 9780809072354.
- Chernow, Ron (2004). Alexander Hamilton. New York, NY: Penguin Books. ISBN 978-1-59420-009-0.
- Girard, P. R. (2009). "Black Talleyrand: Toussaint Louverture's Diplomacy, 1798–1802". The William and Mary Quarterly. 66 (1): 87–124. JSTOR 40212042.
- Kennedy, Roger G. (2000). Burr, Hamilton, and Jefferson: A Study in Character. Oxford University Press. ISBN 9780199923793.
- Johnson, Ronald (2014). Diplomacy in Black and White : John Adams, Toussaint Louverture, and Their Atlantic World Alliance. Athens London: The University of Georgia Press. ISBN 978-0820342122.
- "Stevens, Edward". Complete Dictionary of Scientific Biography. Charles Scribner's Sons. 2008.
- Treudley, Mary (1916). "The United States and Santo Domingo, 1789–1866". The Journal of Race Development. 7 (1): 83–145. doi:10.2307/29738186. JSTOR 29738186.

Government offices
Preceded by New office	Consul-general to the French colony of Saint-Domingue; 1799-1801	Succeeded by Tobias Lear (position downgraded to commercial agent)
