= Haiti–United States relations =

- Haiti: United States

Diplomatic mission
- Embassy of Haiti, Washington, D.C.: Embassy of the United States, Port-au-Prince

Envoy
- Ambassador Lionel Delatour: Chargé d'affaires David Howell

Haiti–United States relations (French: Relations Entre Haïti et Les États-Unis; Haitian Creole: Relasyon Ayiti-Etazini) are bilateral relations between Haiti and the United States. Thomas Jefferson imposed a trade embargo on Haiti, and succeeding U.S. presidents refused to recognize the country until Abraham Lincoln in 1862.

Because of Haiti's location, Haiti has the potential to affect the stability of the Caribbean and Latin America and is therefore strategically important to the United States. Historically, the United States viewed Haiti as a counterbalance to Communist leaders in Cuba. Haiti's potential as a trading partner and an actor in the drug trade makes the nation strategically important to the United States. Moreover, the two are tied by a large Haitian diaspora residing in the United States. The U.S. occupied Haiti longer than any other Caribbean country (from 1915 to 1934, from 1994 to 1995, and in 2004).

Public opinion polling of Haitians has found overall approval of the United States. According to a 2011 Gallup survey, 79% of Haitians approved of U.S. leadership, with 18% disapproving and 3% uncertain, the highest rating for any surveyed country in the Americas.

== History ==
=== Haiti–United States relations (1800–1914) ===
Then-U.S. Secretary of the Treasury Alexander Hamilton and other Federalists supported Toussaint Louverture's revolution against France in Haiti, revolution fought by enslaved Africans. Hamilton's suggestions helped shape the Haitian Constitution. In 1804 Haiti became the Western Hemisphere's first independent state with a majority Black population. Hamilton urged closer economic and diplomatic ties.

Hamilton and Timothy Pickering worked to convince John Adams to appoint Edward Stevens as the United States consul-general in Saint-Domingue (later Haiti) from 1799 to 1800. Adams sent Stevens to Haiti with instructions to establish a relationship with Toussaint and express support for his regime. The Federalist administration hoped to incite a movement toward Haitian independence, but Louverture maintained a colonial relationship with France. Stevens's title, consul, suggested a diplomat attached to a country not a colony, reflecting the Adams administration's view of the Haitian situation. Following his arrival in Haiti in April 1799, Stevens succeeded in accomplishing several of his objectives, including: the suppression of privateers operating out of the colony, protections for American lives and property, and right of entry for American vessels. On June 13, 1799, he signed a convention which resulted in an armistice and gave protections to American merchantmen from Haitian privateers, in addition to allowing U.S. ships to enter Haiti and engage in free trade.

Following the Federalist Party's defeat in the 1800 United States presidential election, the United States under President Jefferson (a Virginia slaveowner who only supported manumission of African-Americans from slavery on the condition of voluntary removal to Africa) withdrew diplomatic recognition from Toussaint's autonomous government and worked to curry favor with the government of Napoleon Bonaparte. Pro-slavery southerners in the United States aided in delaying the United States' recognition of Haiti's independence.

President Abraham Lincoln spoke in favor of recognizing both Haiti and Liberia at the opening of the 37th United States Congress in 1861. Senator Charles Sumner introduced a bill to extend recognition to both countries on February 4, 1862, and it eventually passed and was signed into law by Lincoln. The United States recognized the independence of Haiti, which was achieved in 1804, on July 12, 1862, with Benjamin F. Whidden as its first representative.

President Andrew Johnson suggested annexing the island to secure influence over Europe in the Caribbean. The US government never followed through but posted active military on the island. In the 19th century, people who were mixed-race and blacks often entered into conflicts and called on foreign intervention. According to historian Hans Schmidt, the US Navy sent ships to Haiti 19 times between 1857 and 1913 to "protect American lives and property" until the United States finally occupied Haiti in 1915. One example of a US-Haiti conflict was the Môle Saint-Nicolas affair.

=== Occupation of Haiti by the United States (1915–1934) ===
From 1915 to 1934 the US Marines occupied Haiti. Prior to the occupation, the US military had taken control of the banks and collected $500,000 to hold in New York. The Haitian constitution was written in a manner that prevented foreign entities from owning land or operating in Haiti. However, as a result of the occupation, the US had influenced the Haitian government to rewrite the constitution to repeal an 1804 provision that forbade foreigners from owning land in Haiti. The occupation impacted the nation's economy as well as the people's self-image and independence. Ultimately, Haitians united in resistance of the US occupation, and US forces left in 1934. Left behind was a newly trained Haitian Army, the Garde, with mostly black soldiers and mulatto officers, who dominated political office until 1947.

=== US interventions in Haiti (1957–2005) ===
From 1957 to 1971, François Duvalier governed Haiti under a repressive dictatorship. Some argue the US tolerated the regime because it was staunchly anti-communist and a counterbalance to communist Cuba during the Cold War. When Duvalier died, his son, Jean-Claude ("Baby Doc") took over and maintained many of his father's policies.

The Reagan administration forced Baby Doc to leave in 1986, and when a repressive military dictatorship arose, Reagan suspended aid. The George H.W. Bush administration also embargoed and then blockaded Haiti, suspending all but humanitarian aid.

==== 1990s ====
After the fall of the Duvalier family and other military regimes, Jean-Bertrand Aristide was elected in 1990, but he was toppled in a coup 7 months later. In 1993, the Clinton administration began to impose an economic blockade, which further impoverished the country, and in 1994, it eventually intervened militarily restore Aristide to power. US support for Aristide waned following concerns about his corruption, and a February 2004 armed rebellion led to his exile.

After René Préval succeeded Aristide, aid flowed again to Haiti, totaling $1.5 billion from 1990 to 2005.

=== Since 1994 ===
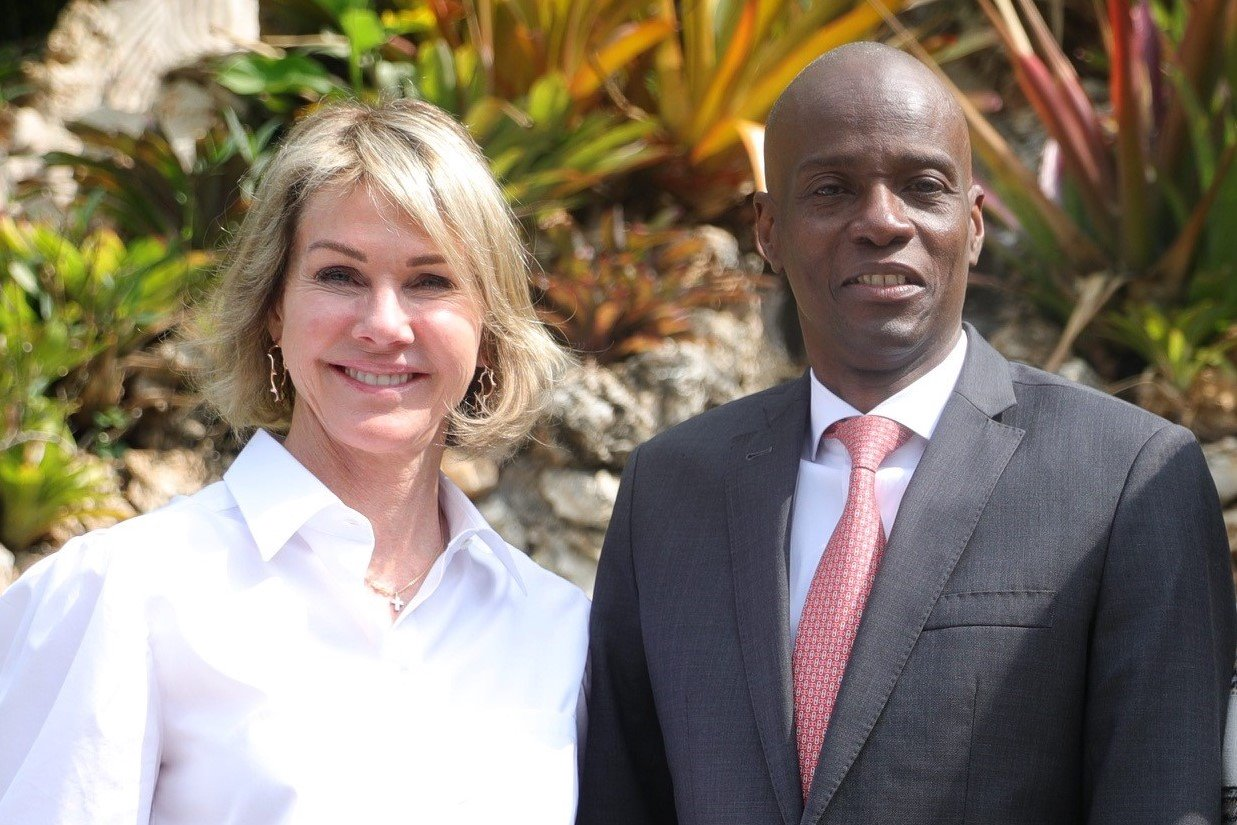
US Ambassador to the UN Kelly Craft and Haitian President Moïse in 2019

Some policy experts argue that US policy and interventions have made problems in Haiti worse by making Haitian welfare America's responsibility. US policy toward Haiti is officially intended to foster and strengthen democracy; help alleviate poverty, illiteracy, and malnutrition; promote respect for human rights; and counter illegal migration and drug trafficking. The US also supports and facilitates bilateral trade and investment along with legal migration and travel. US policy goals are met through direct bilateral action and by working with the international community. The US has taken a leading role in organizing international involvement with Haiti and works closely with the Organization of American States (OAS), particularly through its Secretary General's "Friends of Haiti" group (originally a UN group that included the US, Canada, France, Venezuela, Chile, Argentina, which was enlarged in 2001 to add Germany, Spain, Norway, Mexico, Guatemala, Belize, and The Bahamas), the Caribbean Community (CARICOM), and individual countries to achieve policy goals.

According to a 2005–2006 poll, 67 percent of Haitians would emigrate if they could, and 2 million people of Haitian descent live in the United States, 60 percent of whom are American-born. Four-fifths of Haiti's college-educated citizens live outside Haiti. Following the January 2010 earthquake, the Department of Homeland Security temporarily stopped deportations of Haitians and granted Temporary Protected Status for 18 months for Haitian nationals.

In 2010, US President Bill Clinton apologized for his role in demanding for Haiti to drop tariffs on the importation of subsidized US rice, which had a negative effect on Northern Haitian rice farmers. On May 24, 2010, the Haiti Economic Lift Program (HELP) was signed into US law, ensuring preferential tariffs for Haitian-produced garments. On October 22, 2012, acting US Secretary of State Hillary Clinton gave the keynote speech for the opening of the controversial Caracol industrial park.

In 2011, WikiLeaks leaked info that showed the Obama administration fought to keep Haitian wages at 31 cents an hour when the Haiti government passed a law raising its minimum wage to 61 cents an hour.

In November 2019, US Ambassador to the United Nations Kelly Craft met with President of Haiti Jovenel Moïse at the Haiti National Palace about ways to implement a consensual resolution of Haiti's political crisis through inclusive dialogue. Craft later met with political leaders from other Haitian parties, listened to their different views, and urged an inclusive solution with Moïse. She also urged the Haitian government to fight corruption, investigate and prosecute human rights abusers, and combat narcotics and human trafficking.

In July 2023, amidst a deteriorating political situation and civil unrest following the assassination of Jovenel Moïse, the US State Department ordered its employees and families to leave the island.

During 2024 escalation of the Gang war in Haiti, the US flew in forces to help evacuate nonessential personnel. Later in March, an anti-terrorism security team, FAST, was deployed to reinforce the American Embassy.

On March 2, 2025, UN Secretary-General António Guterres called for urgent international support, proposing a UN Support Office to assist the Kenya-led Multinational Security Support Mission. Over 5,600 people were killed in gang violence in 2024, with major massacres in Port-au-Prince and Pont-Sondé. The International Crisis Group warned that rushed elections, planned for November 2025, could worsen instability. Meanwhile, Haiti’s healthcare system is collapsing, with over 1 million internally displaced and half the population facing food insecurity.

==== United States Special Envoy for Haiti ====
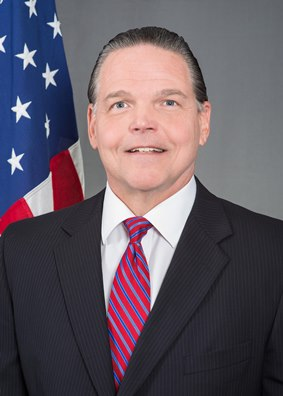
Daniel Foote in 2017

The United States special envoy for Haiti was a diplomatic position within the United States Department of State created after the assassination of Jovenel Moïse. The special envoy coordinates efforts between Haiti and the United States to promote peace and stability in the country.

The inaugural special envoy was Daniel Lewis Foote, who served from July to September 2021. Foote resigned following frustrations that his "recommendations [had] been ignored and dismissed".

In August 2022, four members of Congress called on President Biden to name a new special envoy.

== U.S. economic and development assistance to Haiti ==
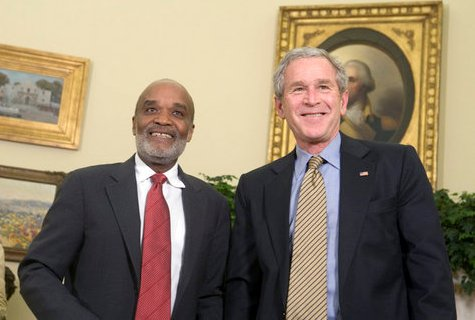
Haitian President René Préval (left) and George W. Bush (right) at the Oval Office, White House in Washington, D.C., on May 8, 2007.

Political insecurity and the failure of Haiti's governments to invest in developing the country's natural and human resources has contributed significantly to the country's current state of underdevelopment. U.S. efforts to strengthen democracy and help build the foundation for economic growth aim to rectify this condition. The U.S. has been Haiti's largest donor since 1973. Between FY 1995 and FY 2003, the U.S. contributed more than $850 million in assistance to Haiti. Since 2004, the U.S. has provided over $600 million for improving governance, security, the rule of law, economic recovery, and critical human needs. The President's budget request for FY 2007 was $198 million. U.S. Government funds have been used to support programs that have addressed a variety of problems.

Some experts, however, have criticized the conditional nature of U.S. aid to Haiti. Often U.S. aid is provided based on conditions dictated by U.S. policy goals, not by Haitian institutions. This appears to be the case for some NGO programs funded under USAID. USAID also played a role in the eradication of the Creole pig, an important asset to small Haitian farmers, during the 1980s as part of an effort to combat an outbreak of the African swine fever virus.

Haiti has been plagued for decades by extremely high unemployment and underemployment. The precipitous decline in urban assembly sector jobs, from a high of over 100,000 in 1986 to fewer than 20,000 in 2006, exacerbated the scarcity of jobs. To revitalize the economy, U.S. assistance attempts to create opportunities for stable sustainable employment for the growing population, particularly in rural areas. More recently, programs that help to increase commercial bank lending to micro-enterprises, especially in the agricultural sector, have helped to create a significant number of jobs. U.S. assistance is channeled primarily through private voluntary agencies and contractors to ensure efficient implementation of U.S. assistance programs.

== Combating Haitian drug trafficking ==
Haiti is a major transshipment point for South American narcotics, primarily cocaine, being sent to the United States. To counter this, the U.S. has taken a number of steps, including vetting and training the counter narcotics division of the Haitian National Police, providing material assistance and training to the Haitian Coast Guard for drug and migrant interdiction, and obtaining the expulsion of several traffickers under indictment in the United States.

== U.S. response to the 2010 Haiti earthquake ==
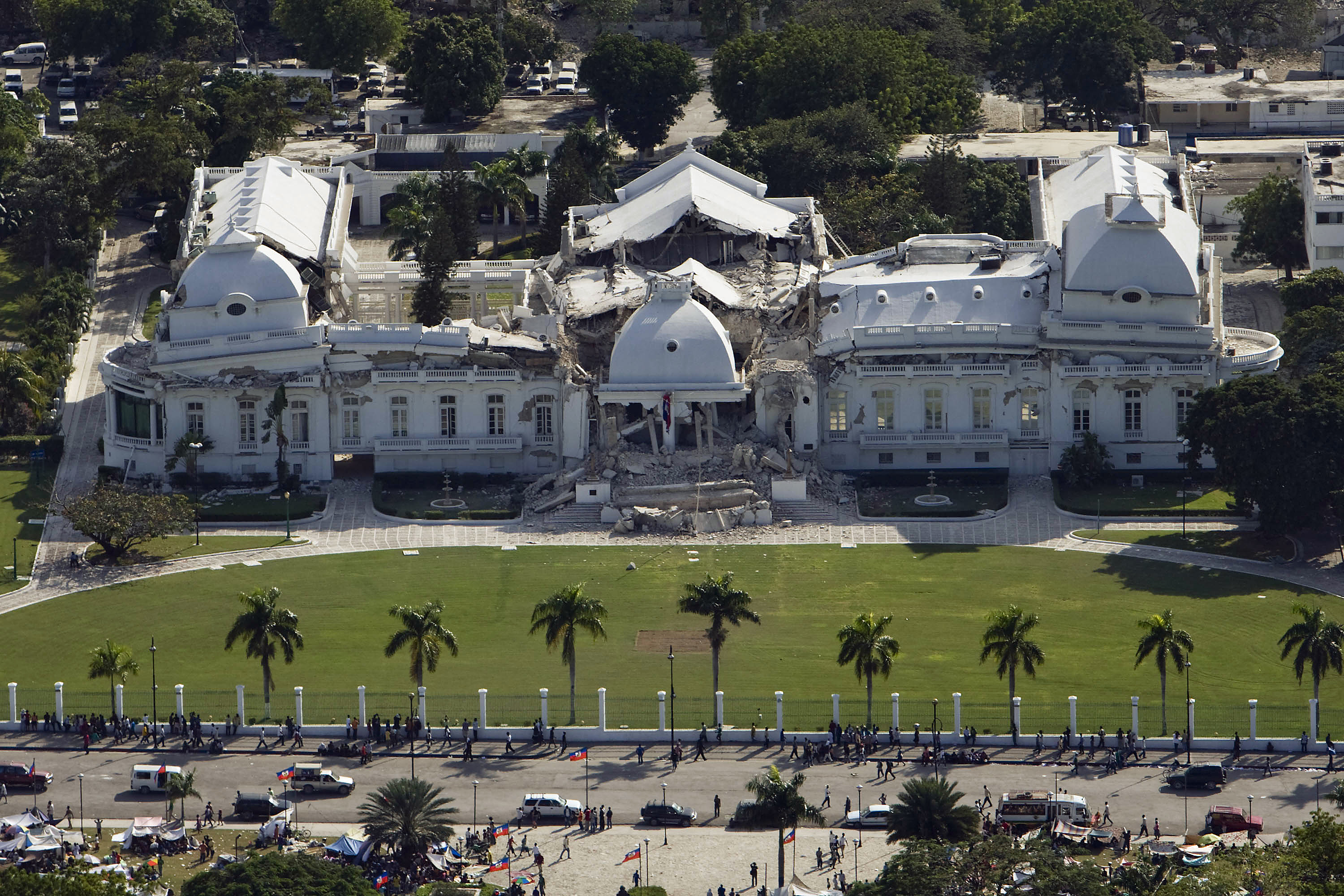
The National Palace following the 2010 earthquake.

The largest earthquake ever recorded in Haiti's history occurred on January 12, 2010 and registered 7.0 on the Richter scale. The quake centered 15 miles southwest of Port-au-Prince and caused catastrophic damage. U.S. Ambassador to Haiti Kenneth H. Merten issued a disaster declaration and the U.S. Agency for International Development (USAID) became the lead agency for the U.S. government's response to the disaster. USAID authorized $50,000 for the initial implementation of an emergency response program. The U.S. government also established an interagency task force to coordinate search and rescue efforts, logistics and infrastructure support, provision of assistance, and conducting needs assessments.

Recent reporting suggests that some in-kind humanitarian aid from the United States has disrupted some of Haiti's internal markets, including the rice supply chain.

Although the State Department and Defense Department have set aside $98.5 million to remove 1.2 million cubic yards of debris, efforts are hampered however by lack of equipment and resources

On January 14, the Obama administration announced $100 million in humanitarian assistance to Haiti to meet its immediate needs, in addition to pre-existing funding appropriated for Haiti. USAID's Office of Foreign Disaster Assistance (OFDA) sent a 32-member Disaster Assistance Response Team (DART).

=== U.S. military response ===
U.S. Southern Command (SOUTHCOM) oversaw the Department of Defense's (DOD) response, and it deployed military assets in Operation Unified Response that supported U.S. and international assistance efforts. As of February 2010, DOD had 20,458 military personnel stationed in Haiti or in its waters. Twenty-six Navy and Coast Guard vessels, 68 helicopters, and over 50 fixed-wing aircraft assisted in the transportation of supplies, relief and rescue personnel, and casualties. U.S. Air Force Special Operations command personnel dispatched to Port-au-Prince within 24 hours of the earthquake and restored air traffic control capability and enabled airfield operations, provided immediate medical services, and conducted search and rescue missions. As of February 2010, DOD delivered 2.1 million bottled waters, 1.79 million food rations, more than 100,000 pounds of medical supplies, and more than 844,000 of bulk fuel. Additional tasks undertaken by DOD personnel include casualty treatment both ashore and afloat, aerial reconnaissance to assist rescue/supply efforts, the distribution of hand-held commercial radios, and the provision of radio broadcast capacity for emergency services information.

== Donald Trump's "shithole countries" comment ==
On 11 January 2018, The Washington Post reported that, in a discussion on protecting immigrants from Haiti, El Salvador, and African countries, Donald Trump allegedly said, "Why are we having all these people from shithole countries come here?" After the report was released, Trump denied on Twitter that he used the term "shithole countries", but said that he used tough language in regards to the countries. Meanwhile, a spokesperson for the United Nations condemned Trump's comment, describing it as "racist". Laurent Lamothe, the former Prime Minister of Haiti, also criticized Trump's comment. Following several days of riots over Trump's comments, the American embassy in Port-au-Prince was temporarily closed on 23 January 2018.

== U.S. business opportunities in Haiti ==
Opportunities for U.S. businesses include the development and trade of raw and processed agricultural products; medical supplies and equipment; rebuilding and modernizing Haiti's depleted infrastructure; developing tourism and allied sectors—including arts and crafts; and improving capacity in waste disposal, transportation, energy, telecommunications, and export assembly operations. Haiti's primary assembly sector inputs include textiles, electronics components, and packaging materials. Other U.S. export prospects include electronic machinery, including power-generation, sound and television equipment, plastics and paper, construction materials, plumbing fixtures, hardware, and lumber. Benefits for both Haitian and American importers and exporters are available under the Caribbean Basin Trade Partnership Act (CBTPA)--which provides for duty-free export of many Haitian products assembled from U.S. components or materials—the successor program to the Caribbean Basin Initiative, and the HOPE Act, which provides additional duty-free preferences for qualifying apparel/textiles products and automotive wire harnesses.

U.S. export opportunities also exist for four-wheel-drive vehicles, consumer electronics, rice, wheat, flour, animal and vegetable fats, meat, vegetables, and processed foodstuffs. The Government of Haiti seeks to reactivate and develop agricultural industries where Haiti enjoys comparative advantages, among which are essential oils, spices, fruits and vegetables, and sisal. The government encourages the inflow of new capital and technological innovations. Additional information on business opportunities in Haiti can be found at the Country Commercial Guide for Haiti.

== Defense and Security ==
=== Law Enforcement ===
The United States supports the P4000+ program of the Haitian National Police with financing, equipment, training and technical assistance to the School of Police (École Nationale de Police, ENP)

=== Military ===
After the Armed Forces of Haiti successfully repelled terrorist attacks on Toussaint Louverture International Airport on the afternoon of 4 March 2024 and helped secure it, the United States Department of State stated, although it had not changed its general policy on the Haitian military, it could provide non-lethal aid to the Armed Forces of Haiti. Twice the Defense Minister, Jean Marc Berthier Antoine, would meet with the Defense Attaché of the U.S. Embassy, United States Coast Guard CMDR Anne Grabins, and Foreign Area Officer/Deputy Security Cooperation Director United States Army Major Joseph "Tripp" Callaway, both part of United States Southern Command (SOUTHCOM). The first meeting would be on 3 July, in the presence of Ambassador Dennis Hankins. The second meeting, on 13 August 2024, would include Lieutenant General (then Brigadier General) Derby Guerrier and Major Ted Tesnor. Topics of discussions included avenues of defense partnership between the two countries, and training of Haitian servicemembers.

On 15 October 2024, while attending the XVI Conference of Defense Ministers in the Americas (CDMA) in Mendoza, Argentina, the defense minister met with the United States Secretary of the Navy Carlos Del Toro. After the conference, in an interview with Le Nouvelliste, he stated that the United States had now decided to support the Armed Forces of Haiti.

Haitian Defense Minister Jean-Michel Moïse welcomed Mr. Hankins and Major Callaway this his offices on December 30, 2024, for discussions rooted in the modernization & reinforcing of the FAD'H. They discussed the integration of the Haitian military into the State Partnership Program with the Louisiana National Guard (initiated in 2011) to reinforce operational capacities, promote technical and strategic subject matter exchange. They also discussed the respect of human rights by servicemembers to ensure a responsible military institution, respecting of democratic values, and finally the matter of recruitment and training of recruits to increase the ranks. Lieutenant (ret.) Emmanuel Paul, the chief of the staff of Defense Minister Moise, confirmed to Le Nouvelliste that the United States are willing to strengthen partnership with the Haitian military, particularly with training, as well as military aid (lethal and nonlethal), to respond to the security woes of the country.

Defense minister Jean-Michel Moise has repeatedly thanks the United States for their support for the Haitian Armed Forces though it is not known what that aid has been. Representatives Gregory Meeks (D-NY) and Gregory Murphy, M.D. (R-NC) introduced a bipartisan bill, the "SAK PASE" Act, which includes provisions for assessment of the importance of support for the Armed Forces of Haiti if the bill is voted in.

In UNSC Resolution 2793(2025), co-penned by the United States, the AFH were mentioned by name. As opposed to the Multinational Security Support Mission in Haiti, the mandate of the Gang Suppression Force (GSF) permits it to collaborate, operate with, and support the Haitian Armed Forces.

This first major breakthrough in military cooperation, defense partnership between Haiti and the United States, since the early 1990s, would come with the voting of H.R.7148. Becoming law on February 3 2026, the budget law H.R.7148 - Consolidated Appropriations Act, 2026, will make "...up to $5,000,000 may be made available for non-lethal assistance and operational support for the Haitian Armed Forces, following consultation with the appropriate congressional committees." A few days prior, Defense Minister Moïse met with defense attaché Lt. Col. Jay Richardson and Army attaché Major Michael Rea, both attached to the U.S. Embassy in Haiti, to discuss and reinforce common interest in stability in Haiti and the Caribbean basin.

Since his appointment, Defense Minister Mario Andresol met with the military attachés of the American Embassy in Haiti multiple times, twice hosting Army Attaché Major Micheal Rea and Lt. Col. Hans Carnice (United States Marine Corps) to his office to discuss building and strengthening defense partnership between Haiti and the US, prioritizing training and technical assistance to build up operational capacities. The US government provided a tactical shooting range to the "Vertières" military base which also hosts contingents of the Gang Suppression Force.

== Diplomatic missions ==
- Haiti has an embassy in Washington, D.C., and consulates-general in Atlanta, Boston, Chicago, Miami, New York City and Orlando.
- The United States has an embassy in Port-au-Prince.

== See also ==
- Haitian Americans
- List of ambassadors of Haiti to the United States

== Works cited ==
- Bender, Thomas (2006). A nation among nations : America's place in world history. New York: Hill and Wang. ISBN 9780809072354.
- Girard, P. R. (2009). "Black Talleyrand: Toussaint Louverture's Diplomacy, 1798–1802". The William and Mary Quarterly. 66 (1): 87–124. JSTOR 40212042.
- Howe, Daniel (2007). What Hath God Wrought: The Transformation of America, 1815–1848. Oxford University Press. ISBN 978-0-19-507894-7.
- Treudley, Mary (1916). "The United States and Santo Domingo, 1789–1866". The Journal of Race Development. 7 (1): 83–145. doi:10.2307/29738186. JSTOR 29738186.
