= John Young (engraver) =

British mezzotint engraver

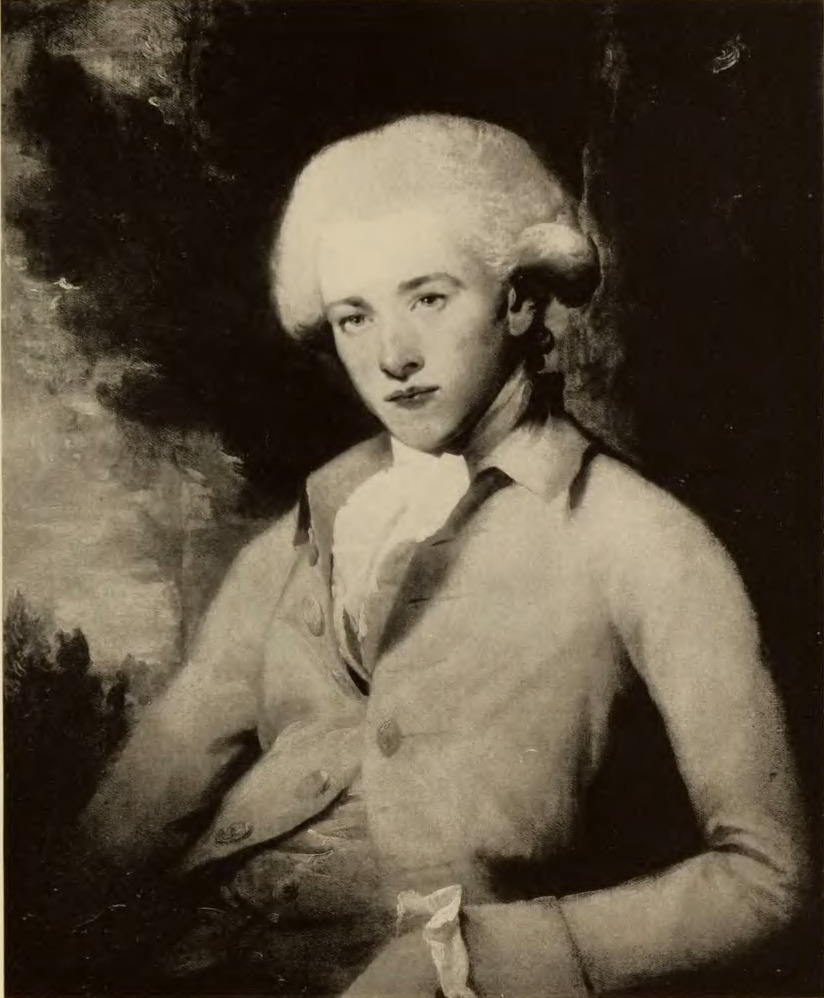
- portrait by Gilbert Stuart
- Born: 1755
- Died: 1825 (aged 69–70); London
- Occupation: Printmaker, copper engraver, illustrator, publisher

John Young (1755–1825), mezzotint engraver and keeper of the British Institution, was born in 1755, and studied under John Raphael Smith. He became a very able engraver, working exclusively in mezzotint, and executed about eighty portraits of contemporary personages, from pictures by Hoppner, Lawrence, Zoffany, etc., as well as some subject pieces after Morland, Hoppner, Paye, and others. His finest plate is the prize fight between Broughton and Stevenson, after Mortimer. In 1789 he was appointed mezzotint engraver to the Prince of Wales. In 1813 Young succeeded Valentine Green in the keepership of the British Institution, an arduous post which he filled with unfailing tact and efficiency until his death. He was honorary secretary of the Artists' Benevolent Fund from 1810 to 1813, and then transferred his services in the same capacity to the rival body, the Artists' General Benevolent Institution. He died at his house in Upper Charlotte Street, Fitzroy Square, London, on 7 March 1825. Young published in 1815 "Portraits of the Emperors of Turkey from the Foundation of the Monarchy to the year 1808", thirty plates printed in colours, with English and French text; and between 1821 and 1825 a series of catalogues, illustrated with etchings by himself, of the Grosvenor, Leicester, Miles, Angerstein, and Stafford galleries.
