= John Yonge (disambiguation) =

John Yonge may refer to:

- John Yonge (c. 1465–1516), English ecclesiastic and diplomatist
- James Yonge (translator) (fl. 1406–1438), or John Yonge, Anglo-Irish translator, author, and civil servant
- Sir John Yonge, 1st Baronet (1603–1663), merchant and Member of Parliament for several Devon seats
- John Yonge (MP for City of London) for City of London (Parliament of England constituency)

== See also ==
- John Young (disambiguation)
- John Yonge Akerman (1806–1873), English antiquarian
