= Johnny Young (disambiguation) =

Johnny Young (1947–2026) was an Australian singer and television personality.

Johnny Young may also refer to:

- Johnny "Man" Young (1918–1974), American blues singer, mandolin player and guitarist
- Johnny Young (diplomat) (1940–2021), United States Foreign Service officer and ambassador
- Johnny Young (politician) (1931–1990), businessperson and political figure on Prince Edward Island

== See also ==
- John Young (disambiguation)
- Jonathan Young (disambiguation)
