= John Youngs =

John Youngs may refer to:

- John Youngs (minister) (c. 1598–1672), English minister who founded Southold, New York
- John E. Youngs (1883–1970), American politician
- John William Theodore Youngs (1910–1970), American mathematician

== See also ==
- John Young (disambiguation)
