= Artists' General Benevolent Institution =

- Abbreviation: AGBI
- Formation: 1814; 212 years ago
- Founder: Artists who were members of the Royal Academy of Arts such as Sir John Soane and John Constable
- Type: Nonprofit organization
- Legal status: Royal Charter
- Purpose: Provide financial support to professional visual artists and their dependents in need. Grants are given to artists unable to work due to injury or illness
- Location(s): London, United Kingdom
- Region served: England, Wales and Northern Ireland
- Services: Financial grants
- Funding: Public donations
- Website: www.agbi.org.uk

The Artists' General Benevolent Institution (AGBI) is the oldest artist-led benevolent fund supporting professional visual artists. The AGBI financially supports professional visual artists in need and their dependents living in England, Wales or Northern Ireland who cannot work or earn an income due to injury or illness. The AGBI Childrens Fund supports the children of artists who have lost the support of one or both parents.

The AGBI supports professional visual artists in England, Wales and Northern Ireland who are in financial difficulty due to illness or accident.[2] AGBI grants and programmes are managed by a small team of staff, Trustees and an Artists Council. Being artist-led means the AGBI operates with a unique understanding of the complex challenges faced by visual artists in need.[3] The AGBI is based in Pimlico, London. The building has an exhibition space on the ground floor where art work is shown on an invitation only basis. Their displays highlight the work that they do supporting artists and acting as an opportunity for outreach to artists who may not know about the grants available to them and their peers. Shows have included "Artists Supporting Artists", "Holding Space" and "(In)Visibility". They have a 211 year old archive that they also make available within these displays. Many objects within the archive remain confidential since no applications are ever shared with general public. [4]

== History ==
It was founded in 1814 by members of the Royal Academy of Arts including John Constable and John Soane. J. M. W. Turner was the first Chairman of the organisation who was voted in by his peers in 1815. Incorporated by Royal Charter in 1842, it is one of the oldest charities in the United Kingdom.

== See also ==
- Artists' Fund Society
- Royal Variety Charity, formerly Entertainment Artistes' Benevolent Fund
- Artists Futures Fund, formerly the Artists' Benevolent Fund
