= Recount (film) =

2008 television film directed by Jay Roach

- Release poster
- Genre: Political drama
- Written by: Danny Strong
- Directed by: Jay Roach
- Starring: Kevin Spacey; Bob Balaban; Ed Begley Jr.; Laura Dern; John Hurt; Denis Leary; Bruce McGill; Tom Wilkinson
- Music by: Dave Grusin
- Country of origin: United States
- Original language: English

Production
- Executive producers: Paula Weinstein; Len Amato; Sydney Pollack; Jay Roach
- Producer: Michael Haussman
- Cinematography: Jim Denault
- Editor: Alan Baumgarten
- Running time: 116 minutes
- Production companies: Spring Creek Productions; Mirage Enterprises; Trigger Street Productions; Everyman Pictures

Original release
- Network: HBO
- Release: May 25, 2008

Recount is a 2008 American political drama television film about Florida's vote recount during the 2000 United States presidential election. Directed by Jay Roach and written by Danny Strong, the film stars Kevin Spacey, Bob Balaban, Ed Begley Jr., Laura Dern, John Hurt, Denis Leary, Bruce McGill, and Tom Wilkinson. It premiered on HBO on May 25, 2008.

The film was nominated for 11 Primetime Emmy Awards, winning 3 for Outstanding Television Movie, Outstanding Directing for a Miniseries or Movie (Roach), and Outstanding Single-Camera Picture Editing for a Miniseries or a Movie (Baumgarten). It was also nominated for 5 Golden Globe Awards, winning Best Supporting Actress – Series, Miniseries or Television Film (for Dern).

== Plot ==
Recount chronicles the 2000 U.S. presidential election, Bush v. Gore case between Governor of Texas George W. Bush and U.S. Vice President Al Gore. It begins with the election on November 7 and ends with the Supreme Court ruling, which stopped the Florida election recount on December 12.

Key points depicted include: Gore's retraction of his personal telephone concession to Bush in the early hours of November 8; the decision by the Gore campaign to sue for hand recounts in Democratic strongholds where voting irregularities were alleged, especially in light of the statistical dead heat revealed by the reported machine recount; Republican pressure on Florida's Secretary of State Katherine Harris in light of her legally mandated responsibilities; the attention focused on the hand recounts by media, parties, and the public; the two major announcements by Florida Supreme Court spokesman Craig Waters extending the deadline for returns in the initial recount (November 21, 2000) and ordering a statewide recount of votes (December 8, 2000), and later overturned by the U.S. Supreme Court; and finally the adversarial postures of the Supreme Courts of Florida and the United States, as well as the dissenting opinions among the higher court's justices.

== Cast ==
- Kevin Spacey as Ron Klain
- John Hurt as Warren Christopher
- Laura Dern as Katherine Harris
- Tom Wilkinson as James Baker
- Denis Leary as Michael Whouley
- Ed Begley Jr. as David Boies
- Bob Balaban as Ben Ginsberg
- Bruce McGill as Mac Stipanovich
- Paul Jeans as Ted Olson
- Bruce Altman as Mitchell Berger
- Alex Staggs as Craig Waters
- Doug Williford as Mark Fabiani
- Gary Basaraba as Clay Roberts
- Stefen Laurantz as Joe Allbaugh
- Mitch Pileggi as Bill Daley
- Jayne Atkinson as Theresa LePore
- Marcia Jean Kurtz as Carol Roberts
- Mary Bonner Baker as Kerey Carpenter
- Bob Kranz as Bob Butterworth
- Raymond Forchion as Jeff Robinson
- Steve DuMouchel as John Hardin Young
- Marc Macaulay as Robert Zoellick
- Antoni Corone as Tom Feeney
- Matt Miller as Jeb Bush
- Terry Loughlin as William Rehnquist
- Judy Clayton as Sandra Day O'Connor
- William Schallert as John Paul Stevens
- Bruce Gray as Anthony Kennedy
- Michael Bryan French as David Souter
- Howard Elfman as Stephen Breyer
- Jack Shearer as Antonin Scalia
- Benjamin Clayton as Clarence Thomas
- Bradford DeVine as Charles T. Wells
- Candice Critchfield as Judge Myriam Lehr
- Annie Cerillo as Barbara Pariente
- Brewier Welch as Harry Lee Anstead
- Derek Cecil as Jeremy Bash
- Robert Small as George J. Terwilliger III
- Patricia Getty as Margaret D. Tutwiler
- Christopher Schmidt as John E. Sweeney
- Olgia Campbell as Donna Brazile
- James Carrey as Chris Lehane
- Brent Mendenhall as George W. Bush
- Grady Couch as Al Gore
- David Lodge as Joe Lieberman
- Carole Wood as Tipper Gore
- Mark Lamoureux as Reporter
- Tom Hillmann as Brad Blakeman
- Adam LeFevre as Mark Herron

== Production ==
=== Director ===
In April 2007, it was announced that Sydney Pollack would direct the film. By August, weeks away from the start of principal photography, Pollack withdrew from the project due to an undisclosed illness, and was replaced by Jay Roach. Pollack died of cancer on May 26, 2008, one day after Recount premiered on HBO.

=== Casting ===
On September 24, 2007, it was announced that Kevin Spacey would star as Ron Klain.

=== Filming ===
Recount was shot in Jacksonville and Tallahassee, Florida.

== Reception ==
=== Critical response ===
On review aggregator website Rotten Tomatoes, the film holds an approval rating of 78%, based on 18 reviews, and an average rating of 6.4/10. The website's critics consensus reads, "Recount deftly brings a controversial chapter of electoral history to dramatic life with a compelling cast, although some viewers may take issue with its conclusions." On Metacritic, the film has a weighted average score of 66 out of 100, based on 25 critics, indicating "generally favorable reviews". Mark Moorman of Het Parool, gave the film a rating of four stars on a scale of five, calling Recount an "amazing and funny reconstruction".

==== Response to fictionalization ====
Entertainment Weekly critic Gillian Flynn argued that the film was biased toward the Democratic perspective: "Recount may not be downright blue, but it's not as purply as it wants to appear. Despite its equal time approach, Recount is an underdog story, and thus a Democrat story." Film critic Roger Ebert disputed claims of bias in his review of the film, stating, "You might assume the movie is pro-Gore and anti-Bush, but you would not be quite right."

In an interview with CNN's Reliable Sources, director Jay Roach responded that the film, "wasn't 100 percent accurate, but it was very true to what went on. ... That's what dramatizations do: stitch together the big ideas with, sometimes, constructs that have to stand for a larger truth." Roach cited All the President's Men as an example. Jake Tapper, an ABC newscaster who was a consultant for the film also stated in response that the film is "a fictional version of what happened" and "tilts to the left because it's generally told from the point of view of the Democrats." The Washington Post further stated that Tapper noted that "while some scenes and language are manufactured, 'a lot of dialogue is not invented, a lot of dialogue is taken from my book, other books and real life.' "

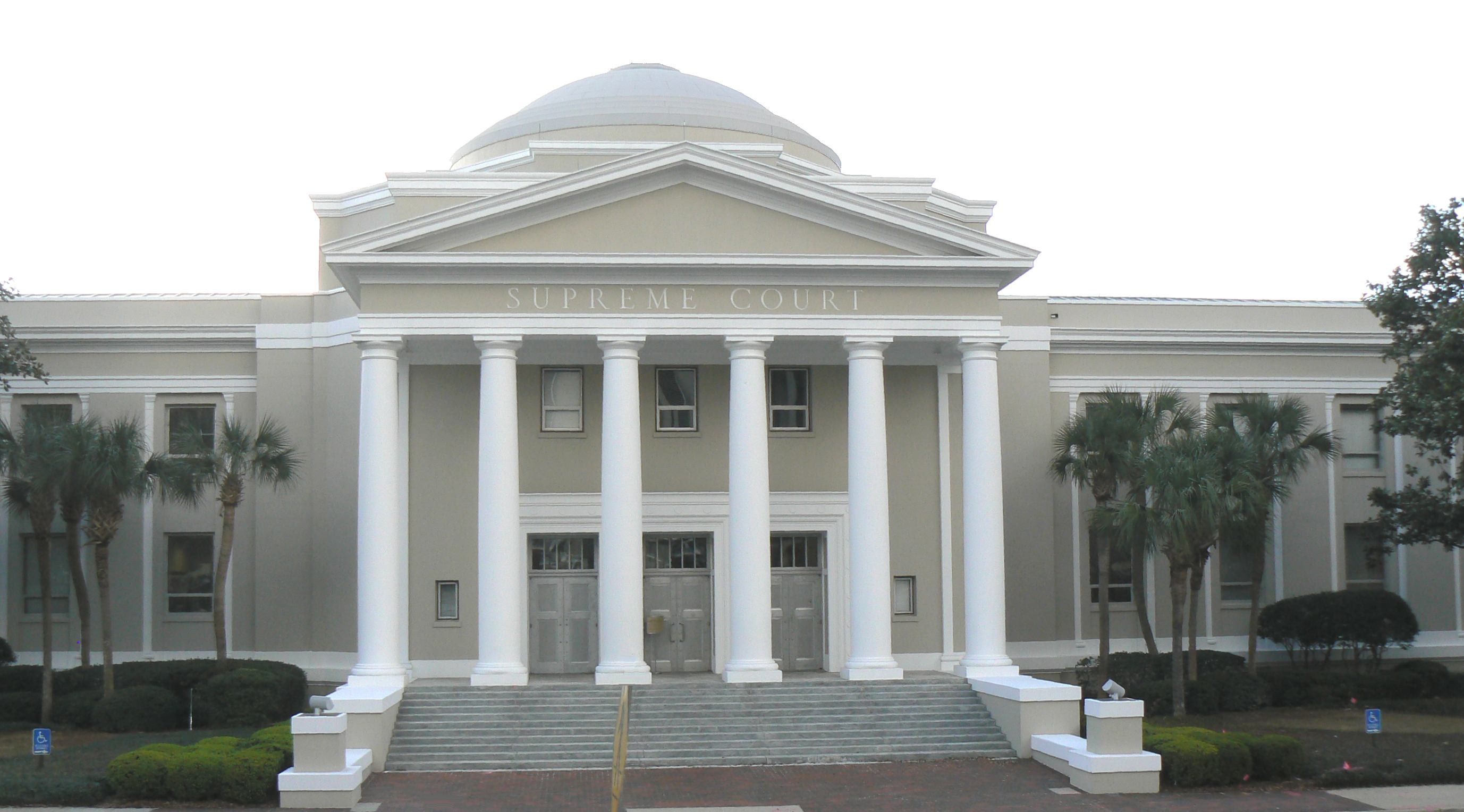
Florida Supreme Court

Florida Supreme Court spokesman Craig Waters agreed that the script departed from the actual statements he made on live television from the courthouse steps in the fall of 2000. "But the words spoken by the actor who played me [Alex Staggs]," Waters said, "are accurate paraphrasis of the things I actually said or of the documents released by the court at the time."

Warren Christopher, who was sent by Gore to supervise the recount, has objected to his portrayal in the film. According to the San Jose Mercury News, Christopher:

... has not seen the film, but he read transcripts of scenes featuring his character, who is portrayed as a high-minded but naive statesman. In one scene, Christopher, played by John Hurt, suggests to former Secretary of State James Baker, who was spearheading Bush's Florida legal team, that they try to resolve the recount through 'diplomacy and compromise.' 'That's absurd,' Christopher says. 'Both Baker and I knew this would be a fight to the end that only one side could win.'

Baker agreed that the film exaggerated his rival's stance: "He's not that much of a wuss," said Matea Gold of the San Jose Mercury News. Democratic strategist Michael Whouley has objected to the amount of swearing he does in the film, and was also uncomfortable with a scene involving a broken chair. In contrast, Bush legal advisers James Baker and Benjamin Ginsberg have largely given the film good reviews; Baker even hosted his own screening of it, though he does refer to the film as a "Hollywood rendition" of what happened.

== Accolades ==
Year	Award	Category	Nominee(s)	Result	Ref.
2008	Artios Awards	Outstanding Achievement in Casting – Television Movie	David Rubin, Richard Hicks, Lori S. Wyman, and Kathleen Chopin	Won	
2008	Online Film & Television Association Awards	Best Motion Picture		Nominated	
2008	Online Film & Television Association Awards	Best Actor in a Motion Picture or Miniseries	Kevin Spacey	Nominated	
2008	Online Film & Television Association Awards	Best Supporting Actor in a Motion Picture or Miniseries	Tom Wilkinson	Won	
2008	Online Film & Television Association Awards	Best Supporting Actress in a Motion Picture or Miniseries	Laura Dern	Nominated	
2008	Online Film & Television Association Awards	Best Direction of a Motion Picture or Miniseries	Jay Roach	Nominated	
2008	Online Film & Television Association Awards	Best Writing of a Motion Picture or Miniseries	Danny Strong	Nominated	
2008	Online Film & Television Association Awards	Best Editing in a Motion Picture or Miniseries		Nominated	
2008	Primetime Emmy Awards	Outstanding Television Movie	Paula Weinstein, Len Amato, Sydney Pollack, Jay Roach, and Michael Hausman	Won	
2008	Primetime Emmy Awards	Outstanding Lead Actor in a Miniseries or Movie	Kevin Spacey	Nominated	
2008	Primetime Emmy Awards	Outstanding Lead Actor in a Miniseries or Movie	Tom Wilkinson	Nominated	
2008	Primetime Emmy Awards	Outstanding Supporting Actor in a Miniseries or Movie	Bob Balaban	Nominated	
2008	Primetime Emmy Awards	Outstanding Supporting Actor in a Miniseries or Movie	Denis Leary	Nominated	
2008	Primetime Emmy Awards	Outstanding Supporting Actress in a Miniseries or Movie	Laura Dern	Nominated	
2008	Primetime Emmy Awards	Outstanding Directing for a Miniseries or Movie	Jay Roach	Won	
2008	Primetime Emmy Awards	Outstanding Writing for a Miniseries or Movie	Danny Strong	Nominated	
2008	Primetime Creative Arts Emmy Awards	Outstanding Art Direction for a Miniseries or Movie	Patti Podesta, Christopher Tandon, and Radha Mehta	Nominated	
2008	Primetime Creative Arts Emmy Awards	Outstanding Casting for a Miniseries or Movie	David Rubin, Richard Hicks, Lori S. Wyman, and Kathleen Chopin	Nominated	
2008	Primetime Creative Arts Emmy Awards	Outstanding Single-Camera Picture Editing for a Miniseries or Movie	Alan Baumgarten	Won	
2008	Satellite Awards	Best Motion Picture Made for Television		Nominated	
2008	Satellite Awards	Best Actor in a Miniseries or Motion Picture Made for Television	Kevin Spacey	Nominated	
2008	Satellite Awards	Best Actor in a Miniseries or Motion Picture Made for Television	Tom Wilkinson	Nominated	
2008	Satellite Awards	Best Actress in a Supporting Role in a Series, Miniseries or Motion Picture Made for Television	Laura Dern	Nominated	
2009	American Cinema Editors Awards	Best Edited Miniseries or Motion Picture for Non-Commercial Television	Alan Baumgarten	Won	
2009	American Film Institute Awards	Top 10 Television Programs		Won	
2009	Art Directors Guild Awards	Excellence in Production Design Award – Television Movie or Mini-series	Patti Podesta, Christopher Tandon, Kim Lincoln, Herman McEachin, John E. Thombleson II, and Anuradha Mehta	Nominated	
2009	Cinema Audio Society Awards	Outstanding Achievement in Sound Mixing for Television Movies and Miniseries	Gary Alper, Gary C. Bourgeois, and Greg Orloff	Nominated	
2009	Critics' Choice Awards	Best Picture Made for Television		Nominated	
2009	Directors Guild of America Awards	Outstanding Directorial Achievement in Movies for Television or Miniseries	Jay Roach	Won	
2009	Golden Globe Awards	Best Miniseries or Television Film		Nominated	
2009	Golden Globe Awards	Best Actor – Miniseries or Television Film	Kevin Spacey	Nominated	
2009	Golden Globe Awards	Best Actor – Miniseries or Television Film	Tom Wilkinson	Nominated	
2009	Golden Globe Awards	Best Supporting Actor – Series, Miniseries or Television Film	Denis Leary	Nominated	
2009	Golden Globe Awards	Best Supporting Actress – Series, Miniseries or Television Film	Laura Dern	Won	
2009	Producers Guild of America Awards	David L. Wolper Award for Outstanding Producer of Long-Form Television	Paula Weinstein, Len Amato, Sydney Pollack, Jay Roach, and Michael Hausman	Nominated	
2009	Screen Actors Guild Awards	Outstanding Performance by a Male Actor in a Miniseries or Television Movie	Kevin Spacey	Nominated	
2009	Screen Actors Guild Awards	Outstanding Performance by a Female Actor in a Miniseries or Television Movie	Laura Dern	Nominated	
2009	Writers Guild of America Awards	Long Form – Original	Danny Strong	Won	

== See also ==
- List of Primetime Emmy Awards received by HBO
