= Craig Waters =

American lawyer (born 1956)

- Waters briefing during Bush v. Gore, December 2000

Spokesman for the Florida Supreme Court
- In office June 1, 1996 – February 28, 2022
- Preceded by: Position created
- Succeeded by: Paul Flemming

Personal details
- Born: 1956 (age 69–70) Pensacola, Florida
- Party: None
- Spouse: Jim Crochet
- Education: Brown University (AB); University of Florida (JD)
- Profession: Lawyer
- Website: LinkedIn

Craig Waters (born 1956 in Pensacola, Florida) is an American lawyer who served as Communications Director for the Florida Supreme Court in Tallahassee from June 1, 1996, to February 28, 2022. In 1994, then Chief Justice Gerald Kogan appointed Waters as staff attorney and established the Court’s Office of Public Information.

Waters worked in areas related to government transparency and First Amendment rights during his tenure as lawyer and government official. As the Court’s spokesperson during the 2000 presidential election, he publicly announced the Court’s rulings regarding the Florida vote.

== Education and early life ==
Waters grew up in Pensacola, Florida, where he attended J. M. Tate High School. He took classes at Pensacola State College (then Pensacola Junior College) before transferring to Brown University.

Before law school, he worked for four years as a journalist for Gannett Company newspapers in Pensacola and Tallahassee. He received his Juris Doctor with Honors from the University of Florida College of Law (now the Levin College of Law), in 1986.

== Non-legal work ==
Waters worked as a reporter for four years with the Florida Gannett newspapers. He also founded the Florida Court Public Information Officers Inc. (FCPIO), a non-profit organized for educational purposes.

== Career at the Florida Supreme Court ==
Waters began work at the Florida Supreme Court on March 2, 1987, as a law clerk for Justice Rosemary Barkett. He also advised Justice Gerald Kogan from Miami. Upon becoming Chief Justice in 1996, Kogan moved Waters permanently into court administration along with his communications job.

In the early 1990s, Waters helped create and expand the Florida Supreme Court's website. In 1994, he led an effort to place all court documents from high-profile cases on the World Wide Web for instant public access.

In September 1997, in cooperation with Florida State University, Waters launched the first comprehensive program to broadcast all court arguments live on television, via satellite, on cable systems, and through webcasts. That program, now called Gavel to Gavel, remains in place and has been imitated by other courts. Several news sites mentioned Waters' work in 2000 for putting pressure on federal courts and the U.S. Supreme Court to provide the public greater technological access to their proceedings.

Waters had worked at the Florida Supreme Court since 1987. In the early 2000s, Waters made the Florida Supreme Court a pioneer in using emerging social media platforms to communicate with the public. This work was influenced by Waters' prior career as a journalist and by his experience as a gay man.

In 2015, Waters began implementing Chief Justice Jorge Labarga's plans, approved by the entire Court, for a statewide communications plan for the state courts. The plan relied heavily on the use of Public Information Officers (PIOs) at all 27 divisions of the Florida State Courts and calls for increasing use of social media and emerging technologies such as smartphones. The plan was implemented through the Florida Court Public Information Officers, Inc. Waters retired after 35 years on February 28, 2022.

== 2000 Election ==
For more than a month following the November 7, 2000 election, Florida's vote for the presidency remained undecided and too close to call, with the outcome hinging on legal decisions from the Florida Supreme Court that were announced by Waters on live television. The first decision occurred on November 21, 2000, with Waters announcing a court ruling extending the vote-counting deadline previously set by Florida Secretary of State Katherine Harris. The second was on December 8, 2000, with Waters announcing a decision requiring a statewide recount of ballots. The United States Supreme Court overruled this last decision on December 12, 2000, in an opinion that effectively awarded the presidency to George W. Bush.

Waters is portrayed in the HBO movie Recount by actor Alex Staggs. The film, which premiered on May 25, 2008, chronicled the events in Florida during the presidential election lawsuits and appeals.

Waters talks with reporters before oral arguments, December 7, 2000

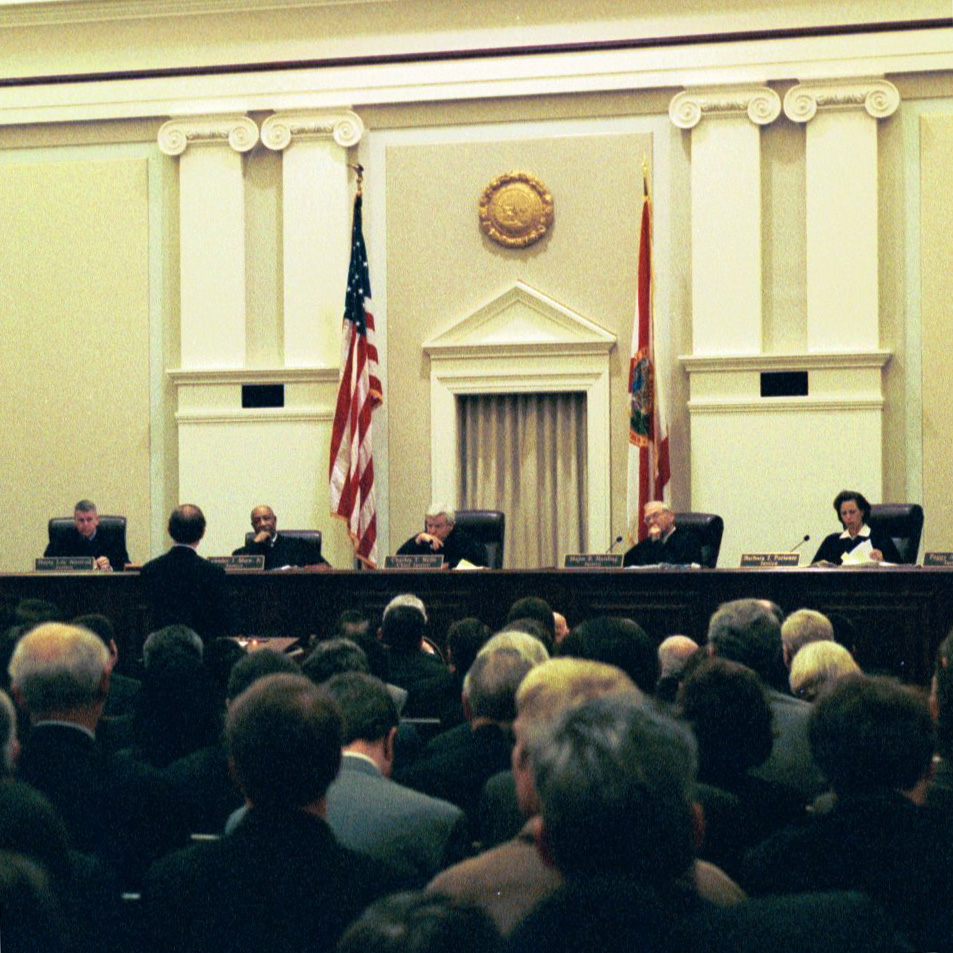
The actual Florida Supreme Court listens to December 7, 2000, arguments

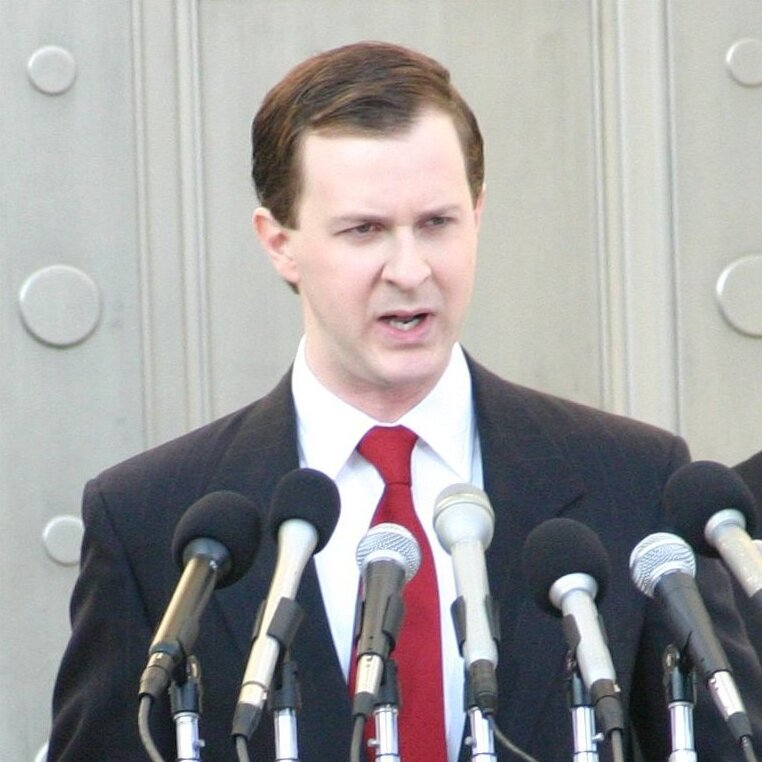
Photo of actor Alex Staggs taken during filming on location for HBO movie Recount, November 3, 2007, on the front steps of the Florida Supreme Court Building in Tallahassee, Florida.

Reenactment of the December 7 argument during filming on November 4, 2007

== Writings and scholarship ==
Waters' works include Waters' Dictionary of Florida Law, published by London-based Butterworth's, a three-volume treatise AIDS and Florida Law also published by Butterworth's, and several dozen scholarly articles on subjects generally related to civil rights, AIDS and disability law, court emergency preparedness, and the use of technology to improve court and media relations. He is the co-author of a comprehensive article on Florida Supreme Court protocol and jurisdiction.

In 2008, the article "Technological Transparency: Appellate Court & Media Relations after Bush v. Gore" was published by the Journal of Appellate Practice & Process. It chronicled the emerging use of public spokespersons and high-technology communication increasingly employed by courts worldwide in the 21st century.

Waters gave a speech at the 10th International Court Technology Conference, organized in 2007 by the National Center for State Courts. He is the co-author of a professional paper describing how state and federal disability laws require rethinking practices in creating and maintaining court websites.

== Other activities ==
Waters has been involved in activities of The Florida Bar, including serving on the editorial board of the Florida Bar Journal and the Florida Bar News. He also serves on the Florida Bar Media & Communications Law Committee and has chaired and hosted the annual Florida Bar Reporters Workshop, held each fall at the Florida Supreme Court Building, a program for training journalists in reporting on the courts and the law.
