= Jackie Young (disambiguation) =

Jackie Young may refer to:

- Jackie Young (politician) (1934–2019), American politician
- Jackie Young (born 1997), American basketball player

== See also ==
- Jack Young (disambiguation)
