= John Young (businessman) =

British-born Australian accountant and businessman

John Carlton Young is a British-born Australian accountant and businessman, who established the Great Southern Group, an agribusiness managed investment scheme (MIS) group of companies. Great Southern Group was listed on the Australian Stock Exchange in 1999, and went into administration in 2009. In 2006, Young was listed in the Business Review Weekly (BRW) 'Rich List' with an estimated worth of A$184 million; however much of that fortune was in shares in his company, which by 2009 were almost valueless.

== Personal life and career prior to the Great Southern Group ==
John Young was born around 1948, and came to Australia in the early 1970s as a Ten Pound Pom. He is married to wife Sheila, and has two sons John Jnr and Aaron. In 2009 he lived in a large property in wealthy beachside Perth suburb, City Beach. Young was an accountant and property manager; he was reported to have sold a "lucrative stake" in his accounting firm just prior to the 1987 stock market crash, using the funds to establish Great Southern. Great Southern has since been his principal business interest, Young not being a director of any other listed company, however he has had other shareholdings, including in a Perth property firm, West Star Trust.

Young avoids publicity: a photograph taken for a news story in 2006 was 'the first time in years Young...agreed to pose for the media'.

== Great Southern Group ==
Established by Young in 1987, Great Southern was a company that sought to take advantage of government plantation and taxation policies that made tax-driven investment in agroforestry an attractive prospect. It began with plantations in Western Australia, and was floated on the stock exchange in 1999. Young retained a large shareholding in the company as its founder and CEO. He was a director of the company from 27 May 1991.

In 2004, Young was included in the Business Review Weekly Rich List, his assets worth an estimated A$140 million. Young sold A$32.6 million worth of shares in 2005. Even so, in 2006 he still held 17 per cent of the company's shares, and BRW's estimate of his fortune had climbed to A$184 million. His stake in Great Southern has been reported as having been worth as much as A$200 million.

On 10 December 2007, Young announced he would retire as managing director from February 2008, though he would remain on the board and intended to retain his remaining shareholdings. By this time Great Southern was facing significant business challenges, its share price had slipped and it was not meeting sales targets. Young, however, indicated these issues were not connected with his stepping down: he was about to turn 60 and said "when you look at a five-year plan, you need someone to adopt that and take it forward for the duration. At 60, I did not want to do that again."

By 2009, the global economic downturn, and regulatory uncertainty associated with MIS schemes, was putting Great Southern under financial pressure. On 16 May 2009 Great Southern Group appointed administrators under the Corporations Act 2001, with the companies' assets passing into control of receivers. In July 2009 the receivers determined that the company was insolvent.
