= Stevensia (plant) =

Scientific classification
- Kingdom: Plantae
- Clade: Tracheophytes
- Clade: Angiosperms
- Clade: Eudicots
- Clade: Asterids
- Order: Gentianales
- Family: Rubiaceae
- Genus: Stevensia; Poit.

Genus of plants

Stevensia is a genus of flowering plants belonging to the family Rubiaceae.

It is native to the Dominican Republic and Haiti on the island of Hispaniola.

The genus name of Stevensia is in honour of Edward Stevens (1755–1834), an American physician and diplomat. It was first described and published in Bull. Sci. Soc. Philom. Paris Vol.3 on page 137 in 1802.

== Known species ==
According to Kew:

- Stevensia aculeolata Alain
- Stevensia buxifolia Poit.
- Stevensia ebracteata Urb. & Ekman
- Stevensia ekmaniana Urb.
- Stevensia farinosa Borhidi
- Stevensia grandiflora Alain
- Stevensia hotteana Urb. & Ekman
- Stevensia minutifolia Alain
- Stevensia ovatifolia Urb. & Ekman
- Stevensia samanensis Urb.
- Stevensia trilobata Borhidi
