= John Young (pitcher) =

Professional baseball player

- Pitcher
- Batted: Right Threw: Right

Negro league baseball debut
- 1923, for the Memphis Red Sox

Last appearance
- 1924, for the St. Louis Stars

Teams
- Memphis Red Sox (1923); St. Louis Stars (1923–1924)

John Young was an American baseball player who played as a pitcher in the Negro league during the 1920s.

Young debuted in the Negro leagues in 1923 with the Memphis Red Sox and the St. Louis Stars. He returned to St. Louis in 1924, which was his final professional season.
