= John Hardin Young =

American legal scholar

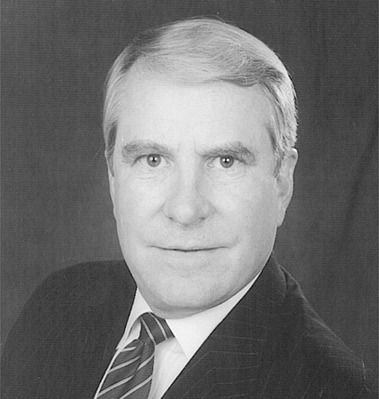
John Hardin Young

John "Jack" Hardin Young is a retired trial lawyer who has a reputation for work in election law and electoral recounts, as well as complex commercial litigation. He was on the team of lawyers for the Vice President Gore during the 2000 Florida election recount and the Bush v. Gore case, and is portrayed in the HBO film "Recount". He is widely known for being the first advocate for a statewide recount strategy that could have resulted in a win for Gore.

Young is currently senior counsel at Sandler, Reiff, Lamb, Rosenstein & Birkenstock where he focuses on election law, including regulatory policy, corporate litigation, and dispute resolution. Young served on the Board of Governors for the American Bar Association and was Chair of the 50,000 member Senior Lawyer Division of the ABA for the year 2017–2018, as well Chair of the Administrative & Regulatory Section in 2019-2000. He currently serves as a special advisor to the Central European and Eurasian Law Initiative Council.

Young is a former adjunct a professor of international and comparative election law at The College of William & Mary Law School from 2008-2023 and has taught at the University of Pittsburgh School of Law and George Mason School of Law. He continues to serve on the National Center for State Courts- William & Mary Law School Election Law Advisory Committee. He is currently a registered lobbyist with the League of Women Voters of Delaware.

== Education ==
Young earned a B.C.L from Oxford University (1976), a J.D. degree from the University of Virginia (1973), and an A.B. from Colgate University (1970).

== Recounts ==
Young is an expert on electoral recounts, domestic and international. He is a former Senior Global Election Dispute Resolution Advisor with the International Foundation for Electoral Systems and other non-governmental organizations (NGOs). He was part of the team of lawyers working with Al Gore during the Florida Recount in 2000. He is portrayed by Steve DuMouchel in the HBO film Recount. He urged the team to recount the ballots in every single precinct, not just the three counties that were initially selected.

His experience on the 2000 recount inspired him to create the now national Promote the Vote (PTV) program. This program, launched by Young in the Virginia 2001 gubernatorial campaign, placed Democratic attorneys on-site at the polls statewide to help resolve voter registration and ballot concerns quickly and effectively. The DNC adopted the PTV program for the 2004 presidential election, when thousands of attorneys volunteered across the country. It remains in effect today, and is credited for helping secure Obama's victory.

He also worked on the recount that occurred in the 2005 Virginia Attorney General race between Bob McDonnell (R) and Democratic state senator Creigh Deeds (D). McDonnell won by 323 votes in an election in which 1.94 million votes were cast. He was instrumental in the 2008 recount of the election between Tom Perriello and Virgil Goode in Virginia's 5th Congressional District, and also worked on the recount for the 1989 election of Douglas Wilder, who became the first African American governor of Virginia.

== Career ==
Young was a partner for many years at Porter, Wright, Morris & Arthur, in Washington, D.C., where he was primarily responsible for commercial litigation. In addition, he worked on technology company formation and capitalization, administrative law matters, business and tax litigation, and antitrust counseling. He also served as General Counsel to one of the regions'Alan Di Sciullo to serve as Vice-Chair largest minority construction companies.

In 2000, Young served as general counsel to the Office of Administration in the Executive Office of the President. From 1985 until 1995, Young was a member of the U.S. Secretary of State's Advisory Committee on Private International Law. Prior to that, he was trial counsel at the United States Department of Labor (1981–1982). Young served as Assistant Attorney General of Virginia from 1976 to 1978. During that time, Young also served as counsel to the Virginia State Board of Elections (1976–1978).

Additionally, he currently sits on the Advisory Committee of the Election Law Program at William & Mary Law School.

In August 2017, Delaware Governor John Carney appointed Young to the Advisory Council on Services for Aging and Adults with Physical Disabilities for a term through 2020. Young recently was awarded by the Commandant of the U.S. Coast Guard with the Coast Guard Auxiliary Commendation Medal.

== Books ==
- International Election Principles: Democracy and the Rule of Law (editor and author, ABA 2009)
- Written and Electronic Discovery: Theory and Practice (with T. Zall & A. Blakley, Nat'l Inst. of Trial Advocacy 5th ed. 2009)
- Young's Federal Rules of Evidence (West Pub. 6th ed. 2001). ISBN 978-0-314-25467-2
- Mastering Written Discovery (with T. Zall, Lexis 3d ed. 2000)

== Education ==
Young received his Juris Doctor from the University of Virginia in 1973 and his B.C.L. from Exeter College at Oxford University in 1976. He has a bachelor's degree from Colgate University.
