= John Richardson Young =

American physician

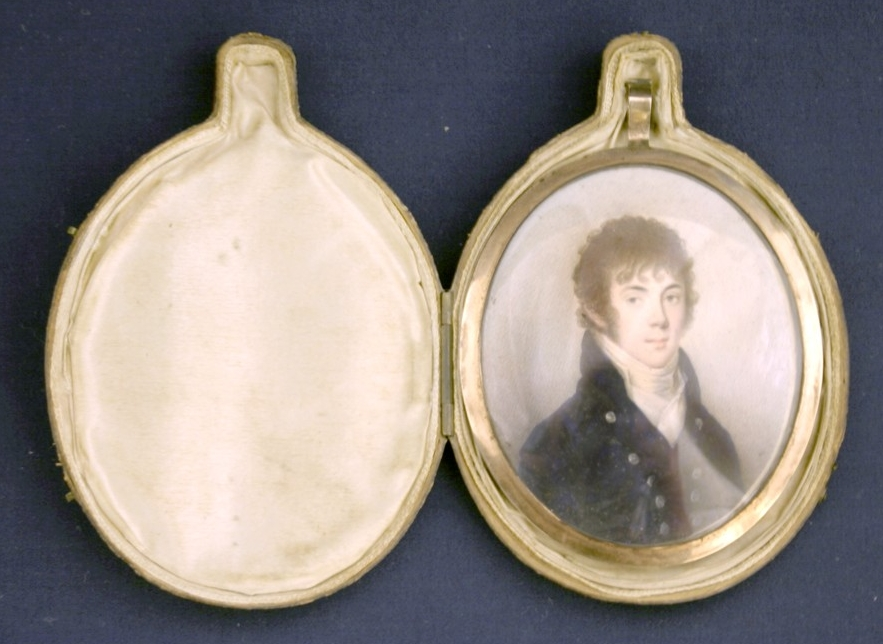
Miniature of Young in 1803 painted by James Peale

John Richardson Young (1782 – June 8, 1804) was an American physician and considered one of the earliest pioneers of experimental physiology and biochemistry in the United States.

Young was born in Hagerstown, Maryland to Ann and Samuel Richardson Young, a physician. His father came from County Down, Ireland and had been educated at Trinity College Dublin and the University of Edinburgh. His mother died in 1791 and Young went to Princeton where he graduated in 1799. He then practiced with his father at Hagerstown before joining Pennsylvania University where he graduated in 1803 with a thesis titled "An Experimental Inquiry into the Principles of Nutrition and the Digestive Processes." Young's teachers included the physician Benjamin Rush and the chemist James Woodhouse. In his thesis, Young documented his experiments conducted on bull frogs and he rejected the contemporary idea that digestion involved fermentation or putrefaction and demonstrated that food was dissolved in the stomach by an acidic juice and that the mass then went to the duodenum where it mixed with bile and pancreatic juice. He however identified the gastric acid incorrectly as phosphoric acid and it was only ten years later that William Prout identified it as hydrochloric acid. Since he had used a frog as an experimental model, he was able to show that neither mastication nor heat had a major role in digestion. He died just a year later and it is believed that he and his sisters succumbed to tuberculosis. Dr Samuel Young, their father, lived to the age of 108.

Young had been a founder of the American Linnean Society.
