= Artists' Fund Society =

The Artists' Fund Society of the City of New York was a benevolent society founded on February 5, 1859, to assist members and their families in cases of illness, old age, and death, and to provide aid to non-member artists in distress. It was incorporated on April 13, 1861.

The society traces its origin to painter William Ranney's death in 1857, which left his wife and two children destitute. Painters from the New York City area contributed works to auction to aid his destitute family. The auction included paintings by George Inness, Jasper Francis Cropsey, Asher Brown Durand, and Frederick Church's "Morning in the Tropics," which sold for $625, at that time the highest amount ever paid at auction for a painting in the United States.

The society began with 25 members who, from 1860 through 1889, were required to annually contribute a piece of art work to be exhibited and sold at auction. Its first organized exhibition was held starting on December 6, 1860, showing 44 pieces for auction in three rooms of the National Academy of Design, with the auction itself held on December 22. Proceeds were invested in bonds, mortgages, and stocks. By the end of 1861, the society had 50 members and a fund of roughly $5,000. By 1864, this fund had grown to over $20,000. Widows were paid annual interest on a sum of $1500, and then paid a lump sum of $1500 when their youngest child reached age 21. More than 27 auctions were held between 1860 and 1889. In 1890, the auction system was replaced by assessments, with all members paying $5 within 30 days of a member's death; the beneficiary then received a percentage of the total.

The society's original constitution (1859) simply stated that members must be "artists by profession." However, by the 1930s amendments stipulated that members must live in New York City or close enough to attend meetings, and that no person over the age of 45 could become a member. Its leadership consisted of a "Board of Control" composed of a president, vice-president, secretary, treasurer and five other members. The board met monthly, and the society sponsored an annual meeting for all members followed by an annual dinner for members and friends.

By 1936 the Board of Control was considering re-organizing or dissolving the society due to rising numbers of members unable to pay assessments, difficulty finding new young members, and "a general lack of interest in the society." In 1946, the Artists' Fund Society merged into the Society of Illustrators.
