= Birkat haMinim =

Curse on heretics which forms part of Jewish rabbinical liturgy

The Birkat haMinim (Hebrew: ברכת המינים "Blessing of the heretics") is a traditional cursing on Jewish apostates, Christians and Christianity itself (Note: the birkat haminim (the blessing, or malediction, of the heretics)...in its premodern forms, functioned in Europe as a curse of apostates to Christianity, Christians themselves, enemies of the Jews, and the Christian governing powers (Langer 2011, p. 3).) which forms part of the Jewish rabbinical liturgy. It is the twelfth in the series of eighteen prayers (Shemoneh Esreh) that constitute the core of prayer service in the statutory daily 'standing prayer' of religious Jews. (Note: "Berakot 3:3,4:1 stipulates that it must be recited by every Jew, including women, slaves and children, three times every day." (Wilson 1989, p. 65))

There has been a general consensus that the eighteen prayers generally go back to some form in the Second Temple period but the origins of this particular prayer and its earliest wording are disputed in modern scholarship, between those who argue for a very early date, either sometime prior to, or roughly contemporary with the Roman conquest of Jerusalem in 70 AD, and those who hold that the formulation crystallized several decades or centuries later. Pinning down its date figures prominently since it is widely taken to indicate the moment when a definitive rupture arose between Judaism and Christianity. (Note: Salo Wittmayer Baron's view was typical in writing that "(The Twelfth Benediction) represented the formal recognition by official Judaism of the severance of all ties between the Christian and other schismatic bodies, and the national body of Judaism" (Wilson 1989, p. 66).)

In its premodern form in Europe, the curse was applied to the enemies of Jews generally and specifically to those who apostasized to Christianity, to Christians and to the governing authorities of the Christian world. (Note: "Many Jewish authorities throughout the premodern period in Europe considered Karaites and Christians to be heretics, although they avoided the word 'Christians,' instead designating them as ... minim." (Ames 2015, pp. 71, 107, 240–241)) (Note: "Jewish expositors of the Middle Ages simply ruled that the minim were Christians, without distinguishing between sects and trends" (Teppler 2007, p. 169).) From the 13th century, the terminology used in the prayer and rabbinical explications of their referent, Christians, began to undergo a process of censorship, imposed from outside or regulated internally, once Christian authorities learnt of them through information supplied by Jewish converts and from scholars who began to access the texts in the original language.

There is no single, uniform Ashkenazi or Sephardic liturgy, and marked differences may exist between prayer books issued by the rabbinates in, for example, England, Israel, or the United States. In modern times, Jews who regularly attend the synagogue only on the Sabbath rarely hear it, if ever since on the Sabbath and holidays an alternative version lacking Birkat haMinim is used. It is mandated for prayer every day among Orthodox Jews, and is recited five times by precentors, six days every week.

== Terminology ==
The expression Birkat haMinim, is composed of birkat (lit. 'benediction') and minim (plural form of min), (Note: Rendered in the Septuagint as genos (γένος: "race, stock, kin") (Siegal 2019, pp. 10, 14).) (Note: In Christian-Aramaic dialects it commonly translates the Greek ἔθνος (ethnos), the word used in the Septuagint to render goyim (other) nations (Langer 2011, p. 59).) a plurivalent umbrella term of opprobrium in rabbinic literature meaning "kinds" or "sorts". (Note: In biblical usage min occurs 31 times, mostly in the Pentateuch, never as an independent noun but invariably in combined forms, such as le-mino etc., with the sense "according to its kind" (Grossberg 2017, p. 63).) The Birkat haMinim is not specific: the term itself has been called a classic example of out-group characterisation, or the "Us versus Them" dichotomy, vis-à-vis how the in-group perceives heretics and "Others". These minim are one of several classes in the Tosefta and the Jerusalem Talmud, the others being perushim (פְּרוּשִׁים separatists), poshim (sinners) and zedim (arrogant ones). In context it refers to sectarians and heretics, the generic concept being denoted by minut, (Note: Adiel Schremer's opinion, dissenting with the identification of minut and heresy, is a minority view, Schremer argues the term is not theological but a communitarian distinction denoting those Jews who put themselves beyond the rabbinically defined fold.) and came to bear the latter narrow sense when Rabbinic Judaism became normative. (Note: "In English the words 'sectarian' and 'heretic' express different degrees of disapproval and social distance. A sectarian is probably best described as a disapproved rival among many factions within the parent group, while a heretic is someone who began in the parent group but who has put himself beyond the pale with respect to some canon of orthodoxy. The transition between 'sectarian' and 'heretic' in rabbinic literature would have been apparent only when Rabbinic Judaism was acknowledge to have become 'normative'. Unfortunately, there is no scholarly consensus about when rabbinic thought became orthodox. Furthermore their rabbis assume that their interpretation of Judaism was always orthodox and never distinguish clearly between 'sectarians' and 'heretics'." (Segal 2002, p. 5)) The "benediction" is a euphemism for what is in effect a curse against those who are thought to have separated themselves, doctrinally and in practice, from beliefs and observances that came to inform the core of Judaism.

Min is one of several terms – apikoros, kofer, (Note: Cognate with Arabic: كافر, romanized: Kafir) meshummadin (Note: Generally translated apostates. Both Hai Gaon in the 10th century and Judah haLevi in the 12th century derived this word etymologically from meshuʻmad("baptised"), haLevi also being of the opinion that these Christians were identified thus at the first mention of meshumadim at the outset of the benedictions (Instone-Brewer 2003, pp. 37, 43).) and tsadoki (Note: Usually Sadducees, but often functioning as a censorship substitution for min (Hayes 2011, p. 133).)- used in the Talmud tractates to refer to varieties of freethinkers, religious dissidents and dissenters, or those who subscribe to the notion of the existence of "two worlds" (thought generally to be a reference to the Sadducees). In one text of the Babylonian Talmud, min was even defined as a pagan who worshipped idols. (Note: The Talmud does state explicitly however that "there are no minim among the idolaters", and the Tosafot would cite this to challenge Rashi's interpretations of the word (see below) (Langer 2011, p. 78).) The term could also be used in regards to gentiles whose practices were similar to those that Judaism defined as heretical.

Some 24 "kinds" or sects are mentioned classically as falling within this category, a calculation attributed to Amora Yohanan ben haNapah, in a context where it was claimed their existence was the cause of Israel's exile. Maimonides attempted to sort out and define precisely the distinctions between these groups but modern scholarship has failed to determine the precise original target groups denoted by this terminology. (Note: "Lacking a sectarian self-consciousness and working in an environment free of sectarian claims and counter-claims, the rabbis had no need for elaborate ecclesiological theories or precise creed and rules of faith which would serve as touchstones to distinguish the true Jew from the heretic...The rabbis lumped together all those who questioned Rabbinical Judaism. It made no difference to the rabbis whether their opponents were Gentile, Christians, Jewish Christians, Gnostic of any variety, pagans, or dissident Jews, all of them, to the exasperation of later scholars, were called minim." (Cohen 2010, pp. 537ff.))

=== Heresy ===
Heresy is "a method of converting difference into exclusion". (Note: "A decisive stage in the process of communal self-definition is reached when a community sets criteria for exclusion." (Kimelman 1981, p. 226)) The emergence of a concept of heresy in Judaism coincides roughly with the development in Christianity of the same concept, hairesis (αἵρεσις) – a word that is often translated as "sect". (Note: The word originally meaning a "philosophical school" (Cohen 2010, p. 546).) In both instances it assumed a pejorative sense. Minim initially were those within the fold halakhically (legally), perhaps disputative Jewish insiders like the Pharisees and Sadducees, who disagreed with broader rabbinical opinions on doctrine, although probably most Jews in this period were not at all "rabbinical". (Note: There are two schools, minimalist and maximalist, regarding the place and power of rabbis within Palestinian society. The former view, associated with Seth Schwartz, Shaye J. D. Cohen and Daniel Boyarin, regards their control of charitable works, synagogues and the like throughout the area as minor in the first centuries of the Common Era. The maximalist position is prominent in Israeli historians (Jaffé 2013, p. 456, n.52).) Whatever happened at Yavne, where tradition assigns the composition of the prayer, many scholars, among them Shaye J. D. Cohen, hold that thereafter, the sectarianism of Jewish communities prior to 70 CE was buried, as minim were threshed out: a growing rabbinical "grand coalition" would have generated a non-sectarian environment with no organized internal challenges, in contrast to the heated sectarian vexations of early Christianity. (Note: "It is thus clear that the way the rabbis dealt with the minim is different from the way the Christian Church Fathers dealt with the groups they considered heretical. While the conflict with different heresies was crucial for the self-definition of the early church, the descriptions of the minim in rabbinic literature are far too miscellaneous and unsystematic to have given them a great role in rabbinic self-definition. The stories about the minim do not suggest in any way that the rabbis had a large-scale program to purify the people from deviant beliefs and groups who held those beliefs." (Hakola 2005, p. 48)) The process of defining heresy in both Judaism and Christianity nonetheless, it has been argued, is virtually identical in having developed in both along similar lines. (Note: For Daniel Boyarin, the process itself of simply drawing such distinctions created the differences themselves and thereby played a seminal role in the shaping of both religious systems (Boyarin 2010, pp. ?; Cohen 2010, pp. 541–542).)

== Historical versions ==
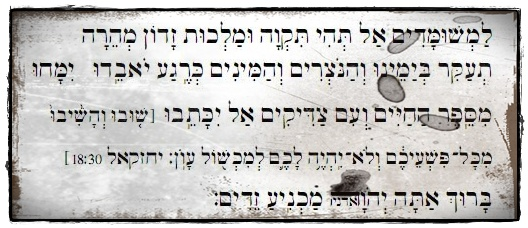
Text of Birkat haMinim from the Cairo Geniza. Note the non-standard use of the Hebrew והנצרים - lit. 'the Nazarenes', on the second line.

The text survives in two core versions, one being that of the Babylonian Talmud. In 1898 Solomon Schechter, with Israel Abrahams, published a 9-10th century CE version of a Hebrew prayer which had been recovered from the Cairo Geniza, and his subsequent findings would revolutionize the study of Jewish liturgy. The peculiarity of this version was that, together with minim, referring to heretics generally, it specifically added a distinct group, Nazarenes. The Genizah actually conserved 86 manuscripts containing six versions of the Birkat haMinim. The Jerusalem Talmud (Note: "the Genizah version of the Birkat ha-Minim, now commonly referred to as the Palestinian recension" (Wilson 1989, p. 65). Joel Marcus argues that "Genizah version" and "Palestinian recension" are both misleading since both are probably Palestinian (Cohen 2016, p. 164, n.112).) version reads:

For the apostates (meshumaddim) (Note: From the Semitic root S-M-D (שמד) "extermination, destruction, annihilation", with the rabbinic noun probably suggesting that the apostates referred to merited annihilation (Langer 2011, p. 45).) let there be no hope,
and uproot the kingdom of arrogance (malkhut zadon), speedily and in our days.
May the Nazarenes (ha-naẓarim/noṣrim/notzrim) (Note: The Bavli refers to Jesus as ha-noṣri.(Kimelman 1981, p. 234)The precise vocalization is disputed. Reuven Kimelman takes it as certain that the original rabbinic Hebrew was vocalized as naṣarim, citing the fact that this variety of Hebrew tended, in contrast to Biblical Hebrew, to write plene where the latter has a defective scriptum. Noẓerim is also possible. Instone-Brewer also thinks that the testimony of Tertullian (Adversus Marcionem.4.8.1: Nos Iudaei Nazarenos appellant.) and Augustine at (Ep.112.13) points to the pronunciationnaẓarim.) (Note: The reference to Augustine should be to a letter thus numbered written by Jerome to Augustine. Augustine elsewhere does write: sicut illi, qui se christianos Nazarenos vocant in his De baptismo,7:1 and Et nunc sunt quidam haeretici qui se Nazarenos vocant, in his Contra Cresconium 1,31,36) and the sectarians (minim) perish as in a moment.
Let them be blotted out of the book of life, (Note: The wording is taken directly from Psalm 69:28 yimmāḥū missêp̄er ḥayyîm (Langer 2011, p. 60)) and not be written together with the righteous.
You are praised, O Lord, who subdues the arrogant. (Note: Martyn orders them in 6 lines: 1. For the apostates let there be no hope; 2. And let the arrogant government; 3. be speedily uprooted in our days.; 4. Let the Nazarenes (Christians) and the Minim (heretics) be destroyed in a moment.; 5. And let them be blotted out of the Book of Life and not be inscribed together with the righteous.; 6. Blessed art thou, O Lord, who humblest the proud!; 1-3, and 6 he regards as antedating Samuel the Small's formulation, since they are attested more than a century earlier essentially in the apocryphal Psalms of Solomon. The apostates would be Hellenizers, the arrogant government Rome, but harking back to the kind of things written in Maccabbees 1,2 re Seleucid power as embodied in Antiochus IV. Samuel's task therefore would have been to adjust the prayer to include recent community sectarian disturbances (Martyn 2003, pp. 62–63).)

This is embedded in a baraita (Note: a baraita is a text that was thought to pertain to the stratum of tradition contemporary with those which the Mishnah and Tosephta embodied (Herford 2006, p. 128).) of the Berakhot 28b-29a written during the Mishnaic period. Early modern printed editions, including the Soncino edition of 1484, have a slightly different version in which the minim are identified as the Sadducees. The addition of Nazarenes to the standard reading suggested that, were the Talmudic accounts of the formulation of the prayer historically grounded, a Jewish consensus that Christians in their fold were heretical had consolidated itself already by the first decades after the destruction of the Second Temple.

Formal bans to expel or suspend dissidents from the community were not yet in place in this period. There were two kinds of ban, niddui and ḥerem, neither of which had been formalized in the first and second centuries: further, no good evidence survives of their use against minim at this time. There are no rabbinic references to ḥerem in the sense of an excommunication or ban prior to the 3rd century CE, while niddui appears to reference to disciplinary action demanding compliance in obedience in order to bring straying Jews back into the fold of the synagogue.

== Historical context ==
At precisely what stage this specific addition was introduced however is not known: hypotheses vary, from prior to the establishment of Yavne during the Second Temple period, (Note: One geniza fragment (T-S K27.33b) appears to assume the Temple is still standing. David Flusser argued that the curse predates Yavne and was directed at the Sadducees (Flusser 2007, pp. 114–116).) to some time after its establishment in 73 CE, to Ephraim E. Urbach's claim that it was introduced shortly after the Bar Kokhba revolt (ca. 135 C.E.), (Note: On Urbach's position generally see Goshen-Gottstein (Goshen-Gottestein 2009, pp. 21–22).) – a hypothesis linked to the first apparent reference to a curse against Christians in a work by Justin Martyr written within some decades of that war. Others such as Pieter W. van der Horst argue for a date just prior to Jerome's time (347–420 C.E.), since, in his commentary on Amos, he first makes explicit a reference to Jewish cursing of (Jewish-Christian) Nazarenes. (Note: "Until today they blaspheme the Christian people under the name of Nazarenes". Jerome, Comm. Am.1.11-12 (Luomanen 2008, p. 283).)

The earliest rabbinic reference to the blessing is in a passage at Tosefta Berakhot 3:25 redacted in the mid 3rd century, but reflecting an earlier source, where minim are mentioned in a blessing of the Pharisees, implying the two were identical. The wording has long been a stumbling block, and subject to many attempts at emendation. Saul Lieberman has argued that it is to be taken as denoting "Separatists" generically, and not the particular group known by that appellation in the New Testament and Josephus.

The earliest external sources explicitly alluding to this Birkat haMinim content thus date to the 3-4th centuries. It is firmly attested as ensconced in rabbinical liturgy by the middle of the first millennium. Rabbinical texts are not reliable for accurate dating of events for this period. For one, they conflate strata of commentary from distinct historical periods. The problem has been to determine therefore what precise meaning was attached to minim in three distinct periods: (a) in Tannaic texts (Note: See (Cohen 2017, pp. 318ff.) for a translation of all Mishnah texts mentioning min/minim/minut. Most intersectarian polemics in this stratum are almost invariably described as either between the Pharisees and Sadducees or the Sages and Boethusians (Schremer 2012, p. 273).) (b) in the Amoraic literature of Palestine and (c) the Amoraic works produced in Babylon (Note: Most minim stories are in the Bavli: in these often a min will pose a provocative question to a tanna, who will expose its absurdity and win the argument by a knockout, and in one group dealing with Biblical verses where Christian and rabbinic interpretations differ, often ridiculing the min as a fool. The Bavli is more engaged with Christianity than the Yerushalmi, whether because it was safer to criticize Christianity in Babylon than in Byzantine Palestine or because the latter dating of the Bavli links it to a period when Christianity strengthened and had to be contended with, is unknown (Siegal 2019, pp. 3 & n.6, 4–5).) in the last of which the word for Nazarenes finally emerges. (Note: "the term noṣrim does not appear in the early rabbinic sources but only in the Babylonian Talmud" (Hakola 2005, p. 46).) In the earliest stratum, of 22 references to minim, most indicate broadly sectarians, Samaritans and also perhaps Jewish Gnostics. (Note: Though the existence of Jewish Gnostics has itself been questioned (Marcus 2009, pp. 535–536, and n.59).) Collectively in both the Tanna and Amora references, minim refer almost always to Jewish heretics.

On one hand it is argued that backdating later practices and liturgy to the early post-destruction period suited the vested interest of rabbis in securing their authority by appeal to an earlier foundational moment, such as at Yavne. Gamaliel II headed the Yavne Academy from approximately 80CE to 115CE, and Martyn speaks of a consensus that the rewording of the benediction dates to around 85 CE, on the assumption that Shmuel ha-Katan must have been very old at the time, dying before 90CE or sometime thereafter in Gamaliel's time. The Mishnah in its final redaction by Judah ha-Nasi (ca.200 CE) records that Gamaliel's rule of the full 18 prayers was contested by three rabbis, who proposed a short or summary prayer in their stead.

=== Yavne ===
The Babylonian Talmud states that the minim benediction was instituted in Yavne, and preserves a story at Berakhot 28b-29a about the origin of the 18 benedictions, and specifically, of how the imprecation against heretics emerged:

Our rabbis taught Simeon ha-Paquli (the Cotton-Dealer) organized the Eighteen Benedictions in order before Rabban Gamaliel in Yavneh. Rabban Gamaliel (Gamaliel II) said to the sages:'Isn't there anyone who knows how to fix the Benediction of the heretics?' Shmuel ha-Katan (Note: The name means "Samuel the Lesser/Small", just as the earlier Simeon ha-Paquli is thought to mean Simeon the Cotton-Dealer (Cohen 2013, p. 190).) stood up and fixed it, but the following year he had forgotten it. (Note: That Samuel the Small forgot it after a year has been conjectured by Joseph Derenbourg to imply that, at this time, the minim imprecation was not originally said daily, but on a particular annual occasion (Cohen 2013, p. 190, n.4).) And he thought about it for two or three hours, (and he did not recall it), but they did not remove him. Why then did they not remove him? Did not R. Judah state that Rav said: 'If someone (a precentor) makes a mistake in any of the (eighteen) benedictions, they don't remove (discharge) him, but if (he makes a mistake) in the Benediction of the Heretics, they do remove (Note: More exactly, one is "called up" i.e. caused to leave the pulpit (reading desk), since "the pulpit or reading.desk was below, not above, the general level of the seats of the congregation. According to later usage, a reader who make a mistake in reciting this benediction, would have been made to leave the desk, because he would be suspected of being a Min", something not done in Shmuel ha Qaton's case since he was its original author (Herford 2006, p. 127).) him, since they suspect that perhaps he is a heretic'? Response: Shmuel ha-Katan is different because he formulated it.

According to this standard account of the formulation ("fixing" i.e. tiqqen), (Note: The key verb here is letaken (לתקן) which can mean to "ordain" or "to repair", so that contextually it could mean either that the benediction was invented at Yavne or revised on that occasion. The latter nuance would suggest that some form of this prayer predated the destruction of the Temple (Marcus 2009, p. 540).) the prayer emerged after the destruction of Jerusalem in 70CE, when Yohanan ben Zakkai and his disciples were permitted to settle in Yavne, where they are said to have constituted a Torah academy for halakhic study, a bet din (court) to try capital cases, with the issuing of nine enactments (taqqanoth). The assembly gradually came to see itself as a successor to the Sanhedrin of Jerusalem. The specific grounds for the curse, in this traditional view according to Shaye J. D. Cohen, arose from the atmosphere of crisis induced by the catastrophic events earlier. At Yavne, the Pharisees interdicted sectarianism, expelled all those who did not belong to their group, excommunicated Jews of Christian observance, and expunged the biblical canon of all works written in Greek and having an apocalyptic tone, in order to establish an exclusivist orthodoxy. The introduction of this form of the curse, in one view, functioned to "smoke out" the minim. If a reader faltered in reciting the prayer (refusal to curse oneself would be tantamount to thanking God for bringing about their own destruction), they would fall under suspicion, and risk expulsion from the congregation.

The reliability of the account has been questioned, and whether such an academy was established and a decision of this kind made at that time remain controversial. Daniel Boyarin, for one, considers it a myth. (Note: "the Yavne myth". (Boyarin 2010, p. 48), as does Akiva Cohen (Cohen 2016, pp. 379ff.)) Hakola considers the interpretation of the account as a supposed "test" to draw out minim as an illogical conclusion to draw from the context of the time period.

References to prayers in the Second Temple period often locate them in private homes, and were not typical of synagogue practices, though daily communal prayer was practiced at Qumran. A general consensus was that the mention of Gamaliel II supports a date between 80-120CE, though it is possible to argue that he has been confused with his grandfather Gamaliel the Elder, which would imply an earlier date.

The words "they ordained it at Jamnia (Yavne)", together with the anecdote of the role of Simeon ha Paqoli, appear to clash with the reference to the Men of the Great Assembly who "ordained Prayers for Israel" mentioned later in the tractate at Ber.33a, and to the comment that "one hundred and twenty elders, prophets among them, ordained the Eighteen Benedictions in order" in the Megilla tractate (17b), which implies that the prayers date back to the time of Ezra (480–440 BCE), and therefore must be devoid of anti-Christian resonance. The apparent differences can be harmonized if one assumes, on the basis of Megilla 18a, that the benedictions had been forgotten over the centuries and then recalled and reordered at Yavne. Boyarin on the other hand takes the whole passage as apocryphal: there was, he claims, simply no institutionalized rabbinic authority which would have had hegemonic authority to make a binding decree of such a prayer from West Asia to Rome down through to the end of the 2nd century, as implied. The story in this view is the result of a retroactive ascription in which Gamaliel functions as a "cypher for so-called anti-sectarian activity".

=== Eliezer ben Hyrcanus ===
There is one instance in the Talmud of min being used specifically of Christians, and it concerns one of the Yavne sages in the early period, excommunicated, like Akabia ben Mahalalel, for failing to accept the will of the rabbinic majority. This locus classicus concerns Talmudic accounts of the fate of Eliezer ben Hyrcanus who was arrested on suspicion of minut (Note: In the medieval aggadhic compilation of Yalqut Shimoni the charge was not minut but apiqorsut. This variant may be due to censorship (Jaffé 2010, p. 46, n.7).) and subsequently brought to trial on a heresy charge before a Roman judge. The incident may have occurred in the reign of Trajan (98-117 CE).

Two versions exist, one at Tosefta Hullin 2:24, the other in a baraita on Avodah Zarah 16b-17a. The charge was dismissed when the governor mistook Eliezer's remark that he put his trust in the judge (God) as a reference to himself. Only later, as he was overcome by depression at being called a min, (Note: "This drama constitutes the central fabric of the existence of R. Eliezer ben Hyrcanus: his excommunication from the house of study, his halakhic decisions rejected then burned, his social isolation, and finally his bitterness at the time of his death when he asked the Rabbis the reasons for their long absence (Sanhedrin 68b)." (Jaffé 2013, pp. 445–446, n.15)) did he recall, on being prompted by Rabbi Akiva, an incident that occurred in the area of Sepphoris, (Note: For the incongruency about the location in the two accounts see Schwartz and Tomson (Schwartz & Tomson 2012, p. 10, n.31).) not far from Nazareth. He had had a casual encounter with a certain Yaakov of Kfar Sikhnin, calling himself a disciple of Jesus, where he experienced pleasure on hearing an halakhic judgment (Note: "It is written in your Torah: 'You shall not bring the hire of a harlot into the house of the Lord your God, for any vow..' (Deuteronomy 23:19). Would it be permitted to make a toilet for the high priest from this money?" And I did not respond to him. He said to me: "Thus was I taught by Yeshu ha-notsri: 'For the hire of a harlot has she gathered them and to the hire of a harlot shall they return' (Micah 1:7), they came from a place of filth, let them go to a place of filth". (Jaffé 2013, p. 444, Schwartz & Tomson 2012, pp. 11–12)) given in the name of Yeshua ben Pantiri/Yeshu ha-notsri. (Note: The reference is to a disciple of "Yeshu ha-notsri" (Jesus the Nazarene) occurs only in the Bavli version, at Avodah Zarah 16b-17a (Jaffé 2013, pp. 441–458, 442–444).) His transgression in listening to and appreciating these remarks, he reflected, consisted in not being mindful of the words of Proverbs 5:8:"Keep your path far from her and do not draw near to the entrance of her house".

=== Sadducee hypothesis ===
The substitution of Sadducees for minim is generally thought to be a result of early modern censorship. However, David Flusser, emphasizing as a key piece of evidence a passage in the third "gate" or chapter of the very early Seder Olam, thought the reading conserved the earliest form, rooted in the Second Temple period, and that the Birkat haMinim as we now know it was the synthesizing handiwork of Shmuel ha-Katan. Flusser's argument against the earliest form being directed at Judeo-Christians considers that it arose, rather, as a response to the Sadducees, considered at the time hellenizing "separatists" (perushim or porshim). This required him to posit that the earliest form must have been a "Curse of Separatists" (Birkat al-Perushim).

=== Hypotheses of contemporary Christian evidence ===
Prior to 70 CE there is no sure evidence that deviant groups were cut off from the community. On the basis of 2 Corinthians 11:24 and Acts 23:1 the apostle Paul, even as a Christian, is thought to have accepted the synagogue's authority over him, implying that even during the time of Persecution, members of the early Church were seen as a sect within the Jewish fold, and that Paul remained a "deviant" Jew, a "reprobate" within the community. (Note: As such, he would be a min. In terms of the later Tosefta Sanhedrin 13:5, though. some argue that he could have been viewed as a meshummad, i.e. apostate (Cohen 2016, p. 116 n.74).)

Both the Gospel of Matthew and the Didache appear to date to approximately this period of Gamaliel's ascendency, and parts of them can be read as registering a similar paleo-Jewish Christian opposition to these stipulations.

=== The Gospel of John and Martyn's hypothesis ===
The Palestinian version of the curse is often discussed in relation to three passages from the Gospel of John (9:22; 12:42; 16:1), dated around 90-100 CE, which speak of Christians being expelled from the synagogue. The influential thesis of J.L. Martyn, advanced in 1968, proposed a link between the curse and passages in this Gospel which speak of Jewish believers in Christ qua Messiah being excluded from the synagogues, implying an authoritative body within the Jewish community has taken some decision of this kind sometime after an authority to do so was established at Yavne.

For the Jews/Judaeans have already agreed that if anyone should confess him to be Messiah he would become an excommunicate from the synagogue (aposunágōgos) (Note: ἤδη γὰρ συνετέθειντο οἱ Ἰουδαῖοι ἵνα ἐάν τις αὐτὸν ὁμολογήσῃ Χριστόν ἀποσυνάγωγος γένηται. John 9:24 (Bernier 2013, p. 1)) (Note: excommunicate from the synagogue represents one word in Greek, ἀποσυνάγωγος, which appears for the first time in that language in this Gospel, here and earlier at 12:42, 16:2. John 9:22 (Martyn 2003, pp. 46–49, 50–51))

This, and other passages, for Martyn, reflected not events in Jesus's time, but in the environment of the Johannine community (c.70-100) and the effect of the Birkat haMinim on them. Most scholars have challenged his construal of the 12th benediction. It is argued that rabbinic jurisdiction at that time would not have extended to Asia Minor or Syria, where John appears to have been composed. A dissenting view is that the Johannine passages reflect directly events in Jesus's own lifetime, c.30 CE., and that the Birkat haMinim is an irrelevancy with regard to those passages.

== Church Fathers ==
=== Justin Martyr ===
In Patristic literature, the curse is first mentioned by Justin Martyr in his Dialogue with Trypho, whose terminus ante quem is ca.160 CE. This text may reflect a real conversation which might have taken place some time shortly after the outbreak of the Bar Kokhba revolt, or in its immediate aftermath (132-136). Neither the Samaria-born Justin nor the figure depicted (Note: "Justin uses the figure of Trypho in the same way as Plato's Socrates did with Parmenides, i.e.., though the Parmenides of Plato's dialogue is not the one we deem to know, he is after all related to the teaching of the real Parmenides. Trypho, however, is not a historical person, and he is not a representative member of an 'orthodox' Jewish community." (Mach 1996, p. 35)) as his Jewish interlocutor of gentile education, were familiar with Hebrew, something which strongly undermines the hypothesis that Trypho is to be identified with the bitterly anti-Christian (Note: Tarphon stated he would burn Christian books containing the name of God even if the effort cost him the lives of his children. (Goodenough 1968, p. 91, Boyarin 2010, p. 57)The context is the stringent rules governing the observance of rest on the Sabbath in Tractate Sabbath. An exception was allowed for cases where sacred books were at risk of burning. In the Tosefta (Shabbat 13:5) Rabbi Tarphon made an exception to this exception by affirming he would let the Gospels(gilyonim) and books of the minim be consumed in a conflagration, even if they contained the name of the tetragrammaton, and it meant risking his son's life. F. E. Peters cites this as evidence Jews and Christians still worshipped together (Peters 2007, p. 182). Shaye J.D. Cohen regards these statements, including similar s similar outburst by Rabbi Yishmael, as rhetorical outbursts, and not proof for a practice of burning Christian books (Cohen 1984, p. 42, n.42).) contemporary Yavne rabbi, Tarphon.

Justin, after charging that Jews dispatched emissaries to calumniate the Christian sect, (Note: This claim goes back as far as the reference to the High Priest recruiting Paul by epistles to travel to Damascus in the mid-30s CE, and seize for detention any followers of Christ. Acts 9:1-2; 22:5 (Cohen 2017, p. 316)) that rabbis enjoin their flock to avoid getting into discussions (Note: μηδὲ εἰς κοινωνίαν λόγων ἐλθεῖν. Justin,Dialogue, xxxviii 1. Krauss glosses over this as "avoid polemics" (Krauss 1892, p. 128, n.7.). This rabbinical command is at Avodah Zarah 27^{b} (Barnard 1964, p. 401)) with them, and that they mock Jesus, mentions seven times that Jews curse Christ, and in two of these, cursing is said to take place in synagogues. Another four passages relate to this, but lack the word for "curse". (Note: The seven passages are Dial.,16,93,95,96,108,123,133. The two regarding synagogue cursing are 16 and 96. Kimelman's count differs from that of William Horbury writing two years later." Justin Martyr mentions nine times that Jews cursed Christ and/or those who believe in him. Of these, five make no mention of the synagogue (93,95,108,123,133), only one (137) mentions it in the context of prayers."(Kimelman 1981, p. 235, Barnard 1964, p. 400))

Scoff (ἐπισκώψητέ) not at the King of Israel, as the rulers of your synagogues teach you to do after your prayers.

The fit with the Birkat haMinim, in Reuven Kimelman's view, fails on four grounds: (a) Christians are not mentioned (b) the words appropriate to a curse, such as katarâsthai or katanathēmatízein (anathematize) used elsewhere in the dialogue, are not used. Instead we have episkōptein, which is not cursing but mocking; (c) the ridiculing takes place after prayers (metà tēn proseukhēn), not in the midst of them; and (d) the prayer does not name Christ.

Barnard however states that Justin's reference is to Birkat haMinim, comparing other Christian testimonies, in Cyprian (200–258), Lactantius (c.250-325) and Gregory Nyssa (c.335–c.395) that appear to reflect a like knowledge of the curse.

=== Origen and Tertullian ===
The prolific theologian Origen (ca.184-234), author of the Hexapla, resident in Caesarea and the most eruditely informed Christian thinker on Jewish matters, has been cited for and against the view that he knew of the curse. The scant evidence in the extant corpus of his huge output consists of three brief comments: (a) a remark in his commentary on the Psalms where he notes that the Jews still anathematize Christ, where the passage is too general to allow any such inference, and may merely echo Justin; and two remarks in his Homilies on Jeremiah, one regarding Jewish cursing of Jesus and plotting against his followers (10.8.2), the other stating: "Enter the synagogue of the Jews and see Jesus flagellated by those with the language of blasphemy" (19.12.31)) These pieces of ostensible evidence likewise fail as testimony, Kimelman argues, because it is Christ, not Christians, who are cursed and no connection is made to prayers.

Likewise Tertullian (155-ca.240) shows an awareness that the Jewish epithet for Christians is Nazareni, – which could be taken as an echo of some form of the Birkat haMinim mentioning noṣrim -and that among them there are those who dismiss him as the son of a prostitute (quaesturariae filius). Yet again, noṣrim is rarely attested in rabbinical sources, and whether it refers to Christians broadly, or a Jewish Christian sect, cannot be ascertained.

=== Epiphanius and Jerome ===
A strong consensus exists for the view that both Epiphanius (310/320-403) and Jerome (c.347–420), both resident in Byzantine Palaestina, were familiar with the curse. Epiphanius, a former Jew who converted to Christianity at 16, in his Panarion 29:4 writes:

Not only do Jewish people bear hatred against them, they even stand up at dawn, at midday and toward evening, three times a day when they recite their prayers in the synagogues, and curse and anathematize them-saying three times a day, "God curses the Nazoraeans."

It is not disputed that the reference is to the Birkat haMinim, since only the Amidah is repeated thrice in the liturgy, and cursing is mentioned. Kimelman, noting that the text does not refer to Christians, but a Jewish-Christian sect, argues that whenever the ha-noṣrim ve-ha-minim phrasing was added (ca.290-377)) it referred to this sect, and not Christians. Ruth Langer likewise argues that Epiphanius does not understand the term orthodox Christians.

His near contemporary Jerome writes:

Until now a heresy is to be found in all parts of the East where Jews have their synagogues; it is called "of the Minaeans" and cursed by the Pharisees up to now. Usually they are named Nazoraeans. They believe in Christ, the Son of God born of Mary, the virgin, and they say about him that he suffered and rose again under Pontius Pilate, in whom we also believe, but since they want to be both Jews and Christians, they are neither Jews nor Christians.

The similarity between the two passages suggested to Alfred Schmidtke that they both drew on an earlier source, Apollinaris of Laodicea, for this information.

== Medieval times ==
The accusation in patristic literature that Jews at prayer blaspheme against Christ and Christians drops from view in the early medieval period, and only reemerges in the 13th century. Pirqoi ben Baboi does mention a prohibition on the benediction in Palestine, which some think might reflect censure of this particular prayer in an assumed ordinance laid down by Heraclius, but the one exception is Agobard of Lyons who in 826/7 cites Jerome on synagogue maledictions and states Jews he interviewed confirmed the point. It is thought probable that this attests to the Birkat haMinim text. (Note: De insolentia Iudaeorumiv (Horbury 1982, p. 29).) Agobard's remarks were part of a remonstration with the Carolingian monarch Louis the Pious, who he thought had granted too many privileges to Jews. His appeal failed to resonate among ecclesiastical authorities. It may reflect peculiarities in the local Lyon liturgy prior to the spread of Babylonian geonic authority to Europe marked by the revision of prayer books according to the model formed in the Seder Rav 'Amram Gaon. By the end of the first millennium rabbinical Judaism had spread and penetrated throughout the diaspora.

The widespread massacres of Jews that took place with the advent of the First Crusade (1096), and the profound grief these acts engendered among the survivors of numerous devastated communities, heightened whatever negative traditions they may have had about Christianity, and fed into ensuing Jewish polemics against Christians in the medieval world. For Israel Yuval, vengeance on Gentiles as part of a messianic process came to play a key role in Ashkenazi thought as the cursing of non-Jews crystallised into a unique ritual.

From the end of the 12th century onwards, dozens of Jewish polemical manuscripts critical of Christianity were produced. Much of this was not simply defensive, or inframural, but arose from genuine attempts to engage with Christian theologians over issues involving the correct interpretation of biblical texts in Hebrew cited in the Greek Gospels. Nonetheless, from this period onwards, the prayer became the object of "intense apologetic and polemic preoccupation".

Within the Jewish fold in this period, Maimonides explained the prayer as arising from exceptional circumstances that required a community response to the emergence of numerous minim who turned Jews away from God. He nowhere indicates who these minim were, other than sorting them into five classes (Note: "Five types are called minim: One who says that there is no God and that the world does not have a ruler; one who says that the world has a ruler but that there are two or more; one who says that there is one Lord but that he has a body and form; one who says God is not the sole first foundation of everything; and one who worships planets or stars or such things as if they were an intermediary between him and the Lord of the world. Each of these five is a min." (Grossberg 2017, p. 73)) and excluded them from the 100 blessings Jews were required to recite each day. Talmudic authorities in Christian lands, such as the Provençal rabbi Avraham ben Yiẓḥak, reflect the view that the original and ongoing object of the curse was Christians. Rashi maintained that the benediction was ordained "when the disciples of Jesus had multiplied", and occasionally glosses minim as referring to galaḥim ("tonsured ones"), i.e. Christian priests. Passages in his commentaries equating minim with Christians were later excerpted as evidence to warrant the Church's crackdown on the circulation of Jewish religious literature. (Note: Rashi's gloss, together with another note he made at B. Rosh Hashanah 17a, which defines minim as "the students of Jesus of Nazareth," were later struck from his work. Cohen says his commentary on Psalms mentioning minim is clearly part of his anti-Christian polemic in that work, not so his commentary on the Torah.)

In the late 1230s, a convert from Judaism, Nicholas Donin brought to the notice of Pope Gregory IX a list of 35 passages in the Talmud that might form the ground for questioning that material. One specific passage refers to the Amidah prayer, described as follows:

Three times every day in a prayer which they consider more important than others, the Jews curse the clergy of the Church, the kings, and all other people, including hostile Jews. This prayer is in the Talmud and ought to be recited standing with feet together, and one should not speak about anything else nor interrupt it until it is completed even if a serpent is wrapped around one's ankle. This (prayer) men and women recite at least three times a day, men in Hebrew and women in the vernacular, and in both cases in a whisper.

The result flowing from this information was that the Pope issued apostolic letters in 1239 to many European countries ordering a crackdown and seizure of Jewish books through England, France, Aragon, Navarre, Castile, León and Portugal. Copies of the Talmud were to be seized in synagogues on the first Sabbath of Lent, and consigned to Dominicans and Franciscans. Few followed the ordinance, with Louis IX of France alone responding by instituting a Trial of the Talmud the following year, so by 1240 the Birkat haMinim was singled out for condemnation. As a result of conversions, among them that of Pablo Christiani who had disputed publicly with Nachmanides in Barcelona (1263), information about what Jewish texts and prayers, including the Aleinu, stated about or hoped would happen to Christians multiplied, and it is possible that the Birkat haMinim text also influenced moves to insist that what Christians considered as numerous blaspheming passages be removed. (Note: The curse is notable for its absence from the massive compendium by the Dominican Arabist and Hebraist Raimundo Martí entitled Pugio Fidei ("The Dagger of Faith" ca.1270) a landmark in Jewish-Christian polemics Fidora 2012, p. 373, which otherwise contains ample excerpts from the Talmud and later rabbinical works Langer 2011, p. 88.)

One indirect consequence of these discoveries was that calls grew for the creation of chairs in various semitic languages, formalized in 1311, at the Council of Vienne. A papal bull, Dudum felicis recordationis, (1320) subsequently ordered the confiscation of all copies of the Talmud. Abner of Burgos, a Jewish physician, even before his public conversion at precisely this time, had already begun to write books in Hebrew for the Jewish community in Spain such as the Sefer Milḥamot haShem (Libro de las batallas de Dios) which were highly critical of prayers like the Birkat haMinim.

In 1323/4 this prayer, in a Latin translation, (Note: "Destructis (seu conversis ad fidem Christi) nulla sit spes et omnibus hereticis vel non credentibus, accusatoribus vel bilinguis, (id est traditoribus omnibus), illud momentum sit, (id est in momento sint perditi), et omnes inimici populi tui Israel velociter occisi sint et regnum iniquitatis velociter sit amens, (id est confractum et fractissimum ad declinandum vel plus quam ad declinandum) cito vel velociter in diebus nostris. Benedictus tu, Deus, conterens inimocos et declinans perversos." (Yerushalmi 2013, p. 85)) was included with several other items in Bernard Gui's guide for inquisitors, Practica officii inquisitionis heretice gravitatis. Gui added a gloss explaining that though the text does not explicitly mention Christians, the wording used makes it clear that this is what is to be understood by asking God to destroy the minim. Shortly afterwards, in 1331, the Franciscan Hebraist Nicolaus de Lyra (1270–1349) in his Postillae perpetuae in universam S. Scripturam, – a work that was to become one of the most authoritative Christian exegeses of the bible – stated that "from the cradle, they (the Jews) have been nurtured in the hatred of Christ, and they curse Christianity and Christians daily in the synagogues".

Around 1400, Yom-Tov Lipmann-Mühlhausen wrote his Sefer haNizzaḥon (Book of Contention/Victory) which, unlike an anonymous Ashkenazi polemical work of the same title, (Note: The Sefer haNizzaḥon Vetus(Yashan), one of the most comprehensive compilations of this genre, dated to the second half of the 13th century (Kabůrková 2017, p. 267, n.32,271) which in turn follows in a tradition established by the Hebrew translation, Sefer Nestor ha-Komer of the Qiṣṣat Mujādalat al-Usquf, written ostensibly by a former Christian priest converted to Judaism, and Jacob ben Reuben's Milhamoth ha-Shem (Ochs 2013, pp. 23–24, 29–90).) was a prudent and respectful treatise that came to mark a milestone in Jewish-Christian polemics. (Note: The terminus ante quem is 1409 (Kabůrková 2017, p. 262, n.7).) The work was a refutation of both Christianity and Karaism and affirmed the superiority of rabbinical Judaism. It was composed in the immediate aftermath of the execution of 80 Jews who had languished a year in jail on a charge brought by a convert, Peter, that Jewish rituals and prayers were derogatory of Christians and asked God that the latter be destroyed. The text of the Birkat haMinim, together with that of the Aleinu, figured prominently in the accusations. Lipmann-Mühlhausen brushed off the interpretation given, claiming that minim simply meant zweifelte Ketzer (Note: Hebrew: meharherim, skeptics) heretics whose doubts left them wavering between Judaism and Christianity, and who, having neither religion, deserved death.

== Modern period ==
The effects of censorship continued into the early modern period. The invention of printing coincides with renewed concerns by Church authorities for the content of all books. In Germany another Jewish convert Johannes Pfefferkorn, author of an explicit attack on the Birkat haMinim, called in 1509/1510 for the burning of all Jewish texts save the Tanakh, a position that blew up into a decade-long polemic with the Hebraist Johannes Reuchlin, in which theologians supported Pfefferkorn while Christian humanists sided with Reuchlin. With the advent of the Reformation and its endeavours to restore an alleged "pristine" version of Christianity, Lutheran scholars in particular came to dominate the field, for Hebrew texts provided extensive witness to the ancient world out of which Christianity emerged and thus served to challenge what they considered the "distortions" of the Catholic Church.

In 1530, a convert to Catholicism from a distinguished Jewish family, Anthonius Margaritha, published a work entitled Der gantz Jüdisch glaub (The Entire Jewish Faith) which translated numerous Jewish prayers, among them the Birkat haMinim, and mentions the daily cursing of Christ. This was to have an important influence on Martin Luther, who quoted extensively from it in his vehemently anti-Judaic excoriation On the Jews and Their Lies (Von den Jüden und iren Lügen) of 1543.

With Pope Clement VIII's promulgation in 1596 of the Index of Prohibited Books, one of which was the Talmud, rules were set out for how Hebrew texts published within the ambit of the Catholic world were to be edited with regard to passages deemed hostile to Christians or blasphemous of their faith. Guided by the sefer ha-ziqquq (Book of Expurgation) compiled by the apostate rabbi Domenico Gerosolimitano Jewish scholars were required to blot out the word minim, and expunge or substitute words in prayers and commentaries on the Tanakh which Jewish tradition associated with Christians, (Note: For example, Abraham Saba's Pentateuch commentary, the Ṣeror ha-Mor(Bundle of Myrrh) interpreted Deuteronomy32:17 as a reference to Christians and their priests as shedim (demons) (Francesconi 2012, p. 144).) such as goyim, nokhri/nokhrit which were understood as vilifying Gentiles. (Note: "Any mention of the term 'avodah zarah' [idolatry], unless it refers explicitly to idolatry practiced in the past, should be replaced by aku'm, that is, worshippers of celestial bodies... Any mention of the word selamim [idols] should be followed by the words shel 'aku'm [of worshippers of celestial bodies]. ... When the word goy, appears, if it may be understood as implying slander, insult or vilification of the Gentile, the word should be erased and replaced by aku'm." (Francesconi 2012, pp. 149–150))

By the 17th century, the Cistercian Hebraist Giulio Bartolocci anticipated the modern view of the primitive text, arguing that the benediction, while targeting Christians, was mainly directed at others, whom both Jews and paleo-Christians would consider heretics, such as Theudas at Acts 5: 36. As mastery of Hebrew progressed, many Christian polemical works against rabbinical Judaism began to emerge. Martí's manuscript had long been lost from view until it was finally printed in 1651, and reprinted in Leipzig in 1678. Shortly afterwards. Johann Christoph Wagenseil's Tela ignea Satanae ("The Flaming Arrows of Satan", 1681) deployed extensive quotes from Jewish writings in an attempt to skewer Judaism on a charge of enmity against Christianity. This was partly motivated by the requirement of German Protestants in a confessional state to defend their religion. This vein culminated with the publication of Johannes Eisenmenger's two-volume Endecktes Judentum, (Judaism Unmasked, 1700) which has an extensive discussion of the 12th benediction. Eisenmenger's work was soon to achieve notoriety as it became the standard source for antisemites opposed to the cause of Jewish emancipation in the 19th century.

By the nineteenth century, as the wording and views towards Birkat Haminim evolved, it was increasingly seen by Jews as a general curse against evil.

== Post-war ==
The culmination of anti-Semitism in the Holocaust led, in the post-war years, to a re-examination of the anti-Judaic elements at the core of Christian tradition. In 1965, the Second Vatican Council published the encyclical Nostra aetate which disavowed the accusation of Jewish deicide and determined that anti-Semitism, defined as a hatred of the Jews as people, was incompatible with Christianity. While theological difficulties remain, in appearing to move away from hard supersessionism, it prepared the way for the hermeneutic vindication of God's covenant with Abraham as irrevocable, and continuing in validity, even if the Mosaic Covenant was not salvific, (Note: As for example in Pope Francis's Evangelii Gaudium (Farrell 2016, pp. 67–72, 71–72).) and a recognition of the possibility that persons outside the Catholic Church who are in "invincible ignorance" have the possibility of salvation.

In the Pentateuch, a primary model for reconciliation is that between Jacob and Esau at Genesis 33:3-4, where the latter kisses (nishek) his brother. Rabbinical tradition, unable to alter the sacred text, adds a dotted superscript over the verb, indicating the given reading was to be cancelled, and glossed it with a pun, suggesting that what was actually meant was that Esau had bitten (nashakh) his brother Jacob, who became the patriarch of the forefathers of the Jews, the Israelites. Esau thereafter became a metonym successively for Rome and Christianity. In the prewar writings of Abraham Isaac Kook, the Ashkenazi chief rabbi in Mandatory Palestine and founder of the influential Mercaz HaRav yeshiva, Christianity is usually described as minut (heresy). (Note: The Talmud cites Rabbi Meir for the view that the books of the minim were examples of a genre of aven gilyon(testament of perverseness/falseness/wretchedness of blank paper/folio, where Heb gilayon (margin) is made to pun on the Syriac word for Gospel), a punning transliteration of the Greek word for a Gospel (εὐαγγέλιον, euangelion) (Langer 2011, p. 79). A variant of the pun has avon gilyon(testament of sin) (Boyarin 2010, p. 58).)

In modern Israel, these Christian overtures, according to Karma Ben Johanan, have met with a chilly reception characterized by increasing hostility among the Orthodox rabbinate, which considers Christianity to be halakhically idolatrous. Tradition excluded the possibility that reconciliation with Rome was on the table. The censorship of contested terms due to Christian pressure has led to moves to restore the original wording. Israel Yuval, reviewing Ben Johanan's book, recalls that even the otherwise liberal Orthodox intellectual Yeshayahu Leibowitz railed, at the time of the Eichman trial, at attempts to justify "[that] vermin [sheretz] of Christianity", and reminded his interlocutor, David Flusser, that "We curse Christianity three times every day."

The Minhag Ashkenaz version of the prayer, as recited three times daily in the weekday Amidah is:

וְלַמַּלְשִׁינִים אַל תְּהִי תִקְוָה
Let there be no hope for informers
כָל הָרִשְׁעָה כְּרֶֽגַע תֹּאבֵד
and may all wickedness instantly perish;
וְכָל אֹיְבֶֽיךָ מְהֵרָה יִכָּרֵֽתוּ וְהַזֵּדִים מְהֵרָה תְעַקֵּר
may all the enemies of Your people be swiftly cut off,
וּתְשַׁבֵּר וּתְמַגֵּר וְתַכְנִֽיעַ בִּמְהֵרָה בְיָמֵֽינוּ
and may You quickly uproot, crush, rout and subdue the insolent, speedily in our days.
בָּרוּךְ אַתָּה יְהֹוָה שׁוֹבֵר אֹיְ֒בִים וּמַכְנִֽיעַ זֵדִים:
Blessed are You, Adonoy, Crusher of enemies. and Subduer of the insolent.

== See also ==
- Anti-Christian sentiment
- Pharisees
- Split of early Christianity and Judaism
- Heresy in Judaism
- Origins of Rabbinic Judaism
- Origins of Christianity
- Christianity in the 1st century
- History of early Christianity
- History of Antisemitism
- Good Friday prayer for the Jews

== Sources ==
- Allison, Dale C. (Summer 2011). "Blessing God and Cursing People: James 3:9-10". Journal of Biblical Literature. 130 (2): 397–405. doi:10.2307/41304208. JSTOR 41304208. S2CID 161277475.
- Ames, Christine Caldwell (2015). Medieval Heresies: Christianity, Judaism, and Islam. Cambridge University Press. ISBN 978-1-316-29842-8.
- Barnard, L. W. (October 1964). "The Old Testament and Judaism in the Writings of Justin Martyr". Vetus Testamentum. 14 (4): 395–406. doi:10.2307/1516793. JSTOR 1516793.
- Ben Johanan, Karma (Winter 2016). "Wreaking Judgment on Mount Esau: Christianity in R. Kook's Thought". The Jewish Quarterly Review. 106 (1): 76–100. doi:10.1353/jqr.2016.0004. JSTOR jewiquarrevi.106.1.76. S2CID 170926041.
- Bernier, Jonathan (2013). Aposynagōgos and the Historical Jesus in John: Rethinking the Historicity of the Johannine Expulsion Passages. BRILL. ISBN 978-9-004-25779-5.
- Bobichon, Philippe (July–December 2003). "Persécutions, calomnies, 'birkat ha-Minim', et émissaires juifs de propagande antichrétienne dans le Dialogue avec Tryphon de Justin Martyr". Revue des Études Juives (in French). 162 (3–4): 403–419. doi:10.2143/REJ.162.3.503632.
- Boyarin, Daniel (2010). Border Lines: The Partition of Judaeo-Christianity. University of Pennsylvania Press. ISBN 978-0-812-20384-4.
- Burnett, Stephen G. (2017). "Luther's Chief Witness: Anthonius Margaritha's Der gantz juedisch glaub (1530/1531)". In Adams, Jonathan; Heß, Cordelia (eds.). Revealing the Secrets of the Jews: Johannes Pfefferkorn and Christian Writings about Jewish Life and Literature in Early Modern Europe. Walter de Gruyter. pp. 183–200. ISBN 978-3-110-52434-5.
- Chazan, Robert (1996). European Jewry and the First Crusade. University of California Press. ISBN 978-0-520-20506-2.
- Cohen, A. (2013) [First published 1921]. The Babylonian Talmud: Tractate B^{e}rākōt. Cambridge University Press. ISBN 978-1-107-67695-4.
- Cohen, Akiva (2016). Matthew and the Mishnah: Redefining Identity and Ethos in the Shadow of the Second Temple's Destruction. Mohr Siebeck. ISBN 978-3-161-49960-9.
- Cohen, Shaye J. D. (1984). "The Significance of Yavneh: Pharisees, Rabbis, and the End of Jewish Sectarianism". Hebrew Union College Annual. 55: 27–53. JSTOR 23507609.
- Cohen, Shaye J. D. (2010). "A Virgin Defiled: Some Rabbinic and Christian Views on the Origin of Heresy". The Significance of Yavneh and Other Essays in Jewish Hellenism. Mohr Siebeck. pp. 534–547. ISBN 978-3-161-50375-7.
- Cohen, Shaye J. D. (2017). "The Ways That Parted: Jews, Christians and Jewish-Christians, ca.100-150 CE". In Schwartz, Joshua J.; Tomson, Peter J. (eds.). Jews and Christians in the First and Second Centuries: The Interbellum 70‒132 CE. BRILL. pp. 307–338. ISBN 978-9-004-35297-1.
- Echeverria, Eduardo (2017). "The Salvation of non-Christians? Reflections on Vatican II's Gaudium et Spes 22, Lumen Gentium 16, Gerald O'Collins, S.J. and St. John Paul II". Angelicum. 94 (1): 93–142. JSTOR 26392619.
- Ehrlich, Uri; Langer, Ruth (2005). "The Earliest Texts of the Birkat Hamanim". Hebrew Union College Annual. 76: 63–112. JSTOR 23508929.
- Farrell, Brian (February 2016). "Our Fathers in the Faith – Nostra Aetate: Fiftieth Anniversary". The Furrow. 67 (2): 67–72. JSTOR 24636051.
- Fidora, Alexander (2012). "Ramon Martì in context: The Influence of the "Pugio Fidei" on Ramon Llull, Arnau de Vilanova and Francesc Eiximenis". Recherches de théologie et philosophie médiévales. 79 (2): 373–397. JSTOR 26485486.
- Flusser, David (2007). Judaism of the Second Temple Period: Qumran and Apocalypticism, Vol. 1. Wm. B. Eerdmans Publishing. ISBN 978-0-802-82469-1.
- Francesconi, Federica (May 2012). ""This passage can also be read differently...: " How Jews and Christians censored Hebrew texts in early modern Modena". Jewish History. 26 (1/2): 139–160. doi:10.1007/s10835-012-9147-5. JSTOR 23352430. S2CID 153850922.
- Goodenough, E. R. (1968) [First published 1923]. The Theology of Justin Martyr. Jena: de:Verlag Frommannsche Buchhandlung. ISBN 978-5-873-92742-5.
- Goshen-Gottestein, Alon (2009). "Jewish-Christian Relations and Rabbinic Literature – Shifting Scholarly and Relational Paradigms: The Case of Two Powers". In Poorthuis, Marcel; Schwartz, Joshua Jay; Turner, Joseph (eds.). Interaction Between Judaism and Christianity in History, Religion, Art, and Literature. BRILL. pp. 15–43. ISBN 978-9-004-17150-3.
- Gregerman, Adam (2018). "Superiority without Supersessionism: Walter Kasper, The Gifts and the Calling of God Are Irrevocable, and God's Covenant with the Jews" (PDF). Theological Studies. 79 (1): 36–59. doi:10.1177/0040563917744652. S2CID 172064933.
- Grossberg, David M. (2017). Heresy and the Formation of the Rabbinic Community. Mohr Siebeck. ISBN 978-3-161-55147-5.
- Hakola, Raimo (2005). Identity Matters: John, the Jews and Jewishness. BRILL. pp. 119–147. ISBN 978-9-047-40725-6.
- Hayes, Christiine (2011). "Legal Reason and the Fashioning of Sectarians". In Stern, Sacha (ed.). Sects and Sectarianism in Jewish History. BRILL. pp. 119–147. ISBN 978-9-004-20648-9.
- Henderson, John B. (1998). The Construction of Orthodoxy and Heresy: Neo-Confucian, Islamic, Jewish, and Early Christian Patterns. SUNY Press. ISBN 978-0-791-43759-9.
- Herford, Robert Travers (2006) [First published 1903]. Christianity in Talmud and Midrash. KTAV Publishing House. ISBN 978-0-881-25930-8.
- Herr, Moshe David (2007). "Jabne in Rabbinic Literature". In Skolnik, Fred (ed.). Encyclopedia Judaica. Vol. 17 (2nd ed.). Thompson/Gale, Keter Publishing House. p. 10. ISBN 978-0-028-65939-8.
- Horbury, William (April 1982). "The Benediction of the "Minim" and Early Jewish-Christian Controversy". The Journal of Theological Studies. 33 (1): 19–61. doi:10.1093/jts/XXXIII.1.19. JSTOR 23957556.
- Horbury, William (2006). Jews and Christians. Bloomsbury Publishing. ISBN 978-0-567-38956-5.
- Instone-Brewer, David (April 2003). "The Eighteen Benedictions and the Minim before 70 C.E". The Journal of Theological Studies. 54 (1): 25–55. doi:10.1093/jts/54.1.25. JSTOR 23968967.
- Jaffé, Dan (2010). "Représentations et attraits du christianisme dans les sources talmudiques. Proposition d'un nouveau paradigme". In Jaffé, Dan (ed.). Studies in Rabbinic Judaism and Early Christianity: Text and Context (in English and French). BRILL. pp. 45–66. ISBN 978-9-004-19062-7.
- Jaffé, Dan (July 2013). "Arrested by Minuth: The Jewish-Christians as represented in Talmudic Aggadah". Revue Biblique. 120 (3): 441–458. JSTOR 44092222.
- Kabůrková, Markéta (2017). "Tela Ignea Satanae: Christian Scholars and the Editing of Hebrew Polemical Literature". In Adams, Jonathan; Heß, Cordelia (eds.). Revealing the Secrets of the Jews: Johannes Pfefferkorn and Christian Writings about Jewish Life and Literature in Early Modern Europe. Walter de Gruyter. ISBN 978-3-110-52434-5.
- Katz, Steven T. (2006). "The rabbinic response to Christianity". In Katz, Steven T. (ed.). The Cambridge History of Judaism: Vol.4. The Late Roman-Rabbinic Period. Cambridge University Press. pp. 259–298. ISBN 978-0-521-77248-8.
- Kessler, Edward (2010). An Introduction to Jewish-Christian Relations. Cambridge University Press. ISBN 978-1-139-48730-6.
- Kimelman, Reuven (1981). "Birkat Ha-Minim and the Lack of Evidence for an Anti-Christian Jewish Prayer in Late Antiquity". In Sanders, E. P.; Baumgarten, Albert I. (eds.). Jewish and Christian Self-Definition. Vol. 2. Fortress Press. pp. 226–244, 391–403. ISBN 978-0-8006-0660-2.
- Krauss, Samuel (October 1892). "The Jews in the Works of the Church Fathers". The Jewish Quarterly Review. 5 (1): 122–157. doi:10.2307/1449915. JSTOR 1449915.
- Langer, Ruth (2011). Cursing the Christians?: A History of the Birkat HaMinim. Oxford University Press. ISBN 978-0-199-78317-5.
- Langer, Ruth (2011). "The Censorship of Aleinu in Ashkenaz and its Aftermath". In Blank, Debra Reed (ed.). The Experience of Jewish Liturgy: Studies Dedicated to Menahem Schmelzer. BRILL. pp. 147–165. ISBN 978-9-004-20803-2.
- Langer, Ruth (9 March 2018). "Cursing the Christians? A History of the Birkat Haminim" (Interview). Interviewed by Jonas Barciauskas. Boston College Libraries – via YouTube. "[3:35] That term is translated literally as a 'blessing of the sectarians', but in reality it's a curse of the sectarians and at times in its history those sectarians were quite clearly Christians.... [14:00] So that what one moves to through this period is a prayer that's moved from being a medieval curse of Christians and Christendom and to a certain extent of Christianity even as a religion, but that's only implicit, to by the nineteenth century a prayer that's interpreted as a curse of evil"
- Limor, Ora; Yuval, Israel Jacob (2004). "Skepticism and Conversion: Jews, Christians and Doubt in Sefer ha-Nizzahon". In Coudert, Allison; Shoulson, Jeffrey S. (eds.). Hebraica Veritas?: Christian Hebraists and the Study of Judaism in Early Modern Europe. University of Pennsylvania Press. pp. 159–179. ISBN 0-8122-3761-7.
- Luomanen, Petri (2008). "Nazarenes". In Marjanen, Antti; Luomanen, Petri (eds.). A Companion to Second-Century Christian 'Heretics'. BRILL. pp. 279–313. ISBN 978-9-004-17038-4.
- Mach, Michael (1996). "Justin Martyr's Dialogus cum Tryphone Iudaeo and the Development of Christian Anti- Semitism". In Stroumsa, Guy G.; Limor, Ora (eds.). Contra Iudaeos: Ancient and Medieval Polemics Between Christians and Jews. Mohr Siebeck. pp. 27–47. ISBN 978-3-161-46482-9.
- Marcus, Joel (October 2009). "Birkat Ha-Minim Revisited". New Testament Studies. 55 (4): 523–551. doi:10.1017/S0028688509990063. S2CID 170501390.
- Martyn, James Louis (2003) [First published 1968]. History and Theology in the Fourth Gospel (3rd ed.). Westminster John Knox Press. ISBN 978-0-664-22534-6.
- Neusner, Jacob (1970) [First published 1962]. A Life of Rabban Yohanan Ben Zakkai: Ca. I-80 C. E. BRILL. ISBN 978-9-004-02138-9.
- Ochs, Christoph (2013). Matthaeus Adversus Christianos. Mohr Siebeck. ISBN 978-3-161-52615-2.
- Peters, F. E. (2007). The Voice, the Word, the Books: The Sacred Scripture of the Jews, Christians, and Muslims. Princeton University Press. ISBN 978-0-691-13112-2.
- Pritz, Ray (1988). Nazarene Jewish Christianity: From the End of the New Testament Period Until Its Disappearance in the Fourth Century. Brill Archive. ISBN 978-9-004-08108-6.
- Reinhartz, Adele (2018). "How Christianity Parted from Judaism". In Greenspahn, Frederick E. (ed.). Early Judaism: New Insights and Scholarship. New York University Press. pp. 97–121. ISBN 978-1-479-82522-6.
- Rosen-Zvi, Ishay (2017). "Pauline Traditions and the Rabbis: Three Case Studies". Harvard Theological Review. 110 (2): 169–194. doi:10.1017/S0017816017000037. S2CID 164418073.
- Schäfer, Peter (2007). Jesus in the Talmud. Princeton University Press. ISBN 978-0-691-12926-6.
- Schremer, Adiel (2010). Brothers Estranged: Heresy, Christianity and Jewish Identity in Late Antiquity. Oxford University Press. ISBN 978-0-199-72617-2.
- Schremer, Adiel (2012). "Thinking about Belonging in Early Rabbinic Literature: Proselytes, Apostates and "Children of Israel," or: Does It Make Sense to Speak of Early Rabbinic Orthodoxy?". Journal for the Study of Judaism in the Persian, Hellenistic, and Roman Period. 43 (2): 249–273. doi:10.1163/157006312X637874.
- Schwartz, Joshua; Tomson, Peter J. (2012). "When Rabbi Eliezer was arrested for heresy". Jewish Studies, an Internet Journal. 10: 1–37.
- Segal, Alan F. (2002). Two Powers in Heaven: Early Rabbinic Reports About Christianity and Gnosticism. BRILL. ISBN 978-0-391-04172-1.
- Siegal, Michal Bar-Asher (2019). Jewish-Christian Dialogues on Scripture in Late Antiquity: Heretic Narratives of the Babylonian Talmud. Cambridge University Press. ISBN 978-1-107-19536-3.
- Stroumsa, Guy G. (2015). The Making of the Abrahamic Religions in Late Antiquity. Oxford University Press. ISBN 978-0-198-73886-2.
- Taylor, Joan E. (2011). "The Nazoraeans As A 'Sect' in 'Sectarian' Judaism? A Reconsideration Of The Current View Via The Narrative Of Acts And The Meaning Of Hairesis". In Stern, Sacha (ed.). Sects and Sectarianism in Jewish History. BRILL. pp. 87–117. ISBN 978-9-004-20648-9.
- Teppler, Yaakov Y. (2007). Birkat HaMinim: Jews and Christians in Conflict in the Ancient World. Mohr Siebeck. ISBN 978-3-161-49350-8.
- Tomson, Peter J. (2019). Studies on Jews and Christians in the First and Second Centuries. Mohr Siebeck. ISBN 978-3-161-54619-8.
- Visotsky, Burton L. (2008). "Goys 'R'n't US: Rabbinic Anti-Gentile Polemic in Yerushalmi Berachot 9:1". In Iricinschi, Eduard; Zellentin, Holger M. (eds.). Heresy and Identity in Late Antiquity. Mohr Siebeck. pp. 299–308. ISBN 978-3-161-49122-1.
- Williams, Frank (2009). Panarion of Epiphanius of Salamis, Book 1, Sects 1-46 (PDF) (2nd ed.). BRILL. ISBN 978-9-004-17017-9.
- Wilson, Marvin R. (1989). Our Father Abraham: Jewish Roots of the Christian Faith. Wm. B. Eerdmans Publishing. ISBN 978-0-802-80423-5.
- Yee, Gale A. (2007). Jewish Feasts and the Gospel of John. Wipf and Stock. ISBN 978-1-556-35645-2.
- Yerushalmi, Josef Hayim (2013). "The Inquisition and the Jews in France in the time of Nernard Gui (1970)". In Myers, David N.; Kaye, Alexander (eds.). The Faith of Fallen Jews: Yosef Hayim Yerushalmi and the Writing of Jewish History. UPNE. ISBN 978-1-611-68487-2.
- Yuval, Israel Jacob (2008). Two Nations in Your Womb: : Perceptions of Jews and Christians in Late Antiquity and the Middle Ages. University of California Press. ISBN 978-0-520-25818-1.
- Yuval, Israel Jacob (14 August 2020). "'We Curse Christianity Three Times a Day': Can Jews and Christians Truly Reconcile?". Haaretz.
