= Pirqoi ben Baboi =

Mesopotamian Talmudic scholar

Pirqoi ben Baboi (Hebrew: פירקוי בן באבוי), also written Pirqoi ben Babui, was a scholar of the Talmud who lived sometime in the 8th–9th century in Mesopotamia, called "Babylonia" in Jewish scholarship of the time. He is chiefly remembered for a polemical letter he wrote, addressed to all places in North Africa and al-Andalus, but thought to be directed in particular to the Kairouan's Jewish community in Tunisia concerning the traditions of the Land of Israel. His writings have been called "one of the most intriguing Babylonian Jewish texts to have survived the vicissitudes of history".

== Biography ==
The precise dates of his floruit are unknown, except that context suggests he lived around 800 CE. His unusual name Pirqoi seems to be a New Persian personal name, with Jacob Nahum Epstein inferring from this hypothesis that he must have been born and raised in Abbasid Mesopotamia.

The alternative view, advanced by Louis Ginzberg, is that he was a native of Palestine who emigrated and settled in Mesopotamia to pursue his studies. The latter theory fits well with the fact of his familiarity with Palestinian usages and texts.

He was a disciple of Rav(a) (Note: ראבא (Gross 2017, p. 251))Abba/Rabah, who had in turn sat at the feet of Yehudai ben Nahman, with some sources saying ben Baboy studied under both. He is associated with both the Sura and Pumbedita academies.

== Background ==
After the Muslim conquest of Iraq, Babylonian rabbis retained strong memories of their communal life under the Sasanian Empire. Politically, the entire Middle East had now come under unified Islamic rule but, like some Syrian Christian writers such as John of Fenek, Pirqoi ben Baboi evoked in exaggerated terms the pre-existing geopolitical division as still marking a cultural rift between the tranquil life of Jews from Sasanian times onward and Jewish communities to the west under Byzantine authority, characterized by endemic persecutions. (Note: Fenek's Rīsh Melle adopts a similar argument to Pirqoi's, but with diametrically opposed conclusions. He argued that the Eastern Church was superior to its western counterpart precisely because the former had undergone persecutions, with the result that a particular diligence in ritual observance was maintained (Gross 2017, pp. 286–292).) The ostensible difference was deployed to buttress Babylonian Jewry's claims to superiority over those in Palestine/Eretz Israel, whose legal customs were a result of persecution (minhagei shmad). Pirqoi ben Baboi would cite a verse from Daniel 7:5 "and three ribs were between his teeth" as prophetic of the sway which the evil empires of Greece and Rome (Edom) would subsequently exercise, to the detriment of proper Torah traditions, over communities to the west of Babylonia, taking the line to be an allusion to the fate of Harran, Nisibis and Adiabene. The Jewish communities in Babylonia, he falsely asserts by ignoring the evidence of the late Sasanian period, never suffered persecution.

== Work ==
He became known for his iggeret, an epistle to the Jews of Kairouan in Tunisia, which according to Ginsberg is the earliest extant halakhic work surviving from the Geonic period. (Note: Ginsberg argued that the addressee was the Jewish community in Eretz Israel. The consensus now is that it was aimed at the Kairouan community (Langer 1998, p. 51, n. 39).) This epistle, the first known example of its kind for advocating the dissemination of the Babylonian Talmud, dated to around 800/810 came to light from its discovery among geniza records. (Note: The publication of the material begin in 1903,(Gafni 1997, p. 96, n. 1). A substantial portion of his recovered work was published by Mann in 1920 (Mann 1920, pp. 129ff.), though a century later his published work remain piecemeal, and surviving fragments have yet to be edited comprehensively in a critical edition (Gross 2017, p. 251).) It contains a polemical attack on what he regarded as the ignorant customs prevailing among Palestinian Jews (minhagei eretz yisrael) at that time, beliefs and practices which had, he argued, spread to major centres of Talmudic learning in North Africa, such as Kairouan, from which they radiated out in turn further west to al-Andalus (the Iberian Peninsula).

This epistle, a virulent broadside against Palestinian Jewish practice, which was held in high reverence in Jewish communities, and the whole Palestinian rabbinical tradition, might have struck its readership as scandalous. Though widely distributed, did not appear to have much effect on the community it addressed, since Palestinian influences remained strong there centuries later, as one can see from the Iggeret of Sherira ben Hanina to Kairouan and in the work of his son, Hai ben Sherira. However the arguments made are echoed in broader diatribes and defenses of piyyut in much later times.

The claim to a superior authority in religious matters was buttressed by the claim that the Babylonian academies, namely the Torah sages according to the Seder Olam Rabbah, departed, with Jeconiah, to Babylon 12 years prior to the Siege and destruction of Jerusalem in 586, and only after their safety was secured was permission granted to destroy Jerusalem and Solomon's Temple. The exile itself was, he argued, an "act of charity (tzedakah)" by God. The Babylonian yeshivot conserved the strength (gevurah) of the Jewish contingent of troops (gibborim) who had formed part of the earlier evacuation, so that the Babylonian scholars, heirs to this exile of the strong, (Note: This reasoning extended to the accompanying craftsmen (ḥarash) and smiths (masgēr) via an argument of etymological reasoning: when the craftsmen spoke, everyone else became hereshim, silent like mutes, while when a smith would "close" (sogēr) a matter of impurity and purities, what is disallowed or permitted, no one could reopen it and assert it was clean (Gross 2017, p. 264).) were themselves warriors (gibborei) of Torah.

In terms of his rhetoric of persuasion, Pirqoy Baboy's mode of thought evinces three simple assumptions:

- What distinguishes Babylonian Judaism from its Palestinian counterpart is that the former never experienced persecution (shemad), (Note: The word "shemad" here in con text refers to a time of persecution, though etymologically it implies "annihilation, extermination" (Langer 2011, p. 45)) whereas it was continuous with the latter.
- The persecutions in Palestine broke the transmission of the Oral Torah there.
- Therefore, the authentic Judaic tradition is conserved in Babylon; that of Palestine is unreliable.

His driving aspiration was to impose the halakhic hegemony of the Babylonian academies over all Jewish communities, and thereby undermine the diaspora's attachment to the Land of Israel. Only the legal code as laid down in the Babylonian Talmud] was a reliable basis for practice of the Oral Law throughout the world. Any custom (minhag) which disagreed with the Babylonian rabbinical canon he considered a "custom of apostasy", which he imagined Edom/Rome had imposed on the Jews of Palestine.

It has been suspected, in this last regard, that the virulence of his censure stems from anxiety over the rise of the Karaites – some of whose positions had been inflected by Palestinian usage (Note: "I Babilonesi avevano un bel dire che la struttura portante delle usanze palestinesi era viziata alla base, in quanto espressione di una paralisi intellettuale imposta dall'esterno all'ebraismo palestinese in un periodo di persecuzioni. Oggi sappiamo bene che questa argomentazione del gaonato babilonese non era piu che propaganda. E il fatto che i Karaiti avessero adottato parte delle usanze palestinesi, nel quadro della loro battaglia contro l'establishment babilonese." (Bonfil 1983, p. 143)) – who refused to accept the oral teachings encoded in Babylonian rabbinical texts. The Karaites, for example, considered fasting on the Sabbath laudable, just as Italian Jews since late antiquity allowed the practice on particular occasions. In the latter instance, this may reflect the persistence of a residue of popular Palestinian traditions of piety notwithstanding strictures against the practice issued by authoritative rabbis.

Ben Baboy frowned on any such deviation from what was established Babylonian practice. These perceived abuses extended to the scrolls of the Torah produced in Palestine, which, he stated, were written on vellum prepared by Gentiles in disregard for halakhic stipulations on their proper production.

Ben Baboy's tendentious, polemical work carries on the goal of his teacher Yehuday Gaon, in trying to persuade the Jews of Palestine to adopt the Babylonian customs of the time instead of the Palestinian ones. He argues that the Palestinian customs were an attempt at reconstruction made after the Muslim conquests, on the basis of fragmentary sourcing, and therefore not an authentic tradition but a divergent and corrupted one. He justifies the Babylonian tradition by placing its founding in the sixth century BCE by distinguished members of the Palestinian community, prior to the destruction of the First Temple, claiming the Babylonians were the true inheritors of the Palestinian tradition in antiquity.

A fragment of Pirqoy ben Baboy's appears to contain, in the form of a quotation, the earliest extant reference to the Pirkei De-Rabbi Eliezer, and plays some role in arguments for dating that work.

== The historical context of Pirqoi's critique ==
In ancient Greece, a distinction developed between súngramma (σύγγραμμα) and hupómnēma (ὑπόμνημα), namely an authorized copy of a book and the private notes made on it. With the rise of Hellenism, this discrimination influenced Palestinian rabbis when they in turn drew a sharp line of demarcation between the Tanakh scriptural corpus, and extra-biblical oral teachings, ascribing greater importance to this Oral Torah than to the written Torah. According to one source, the Pesikta Rabbati, God turned down Moses' request at Sinai that the Oral Torah be written down: he did so to avoid a repetition of what would happen with the Old Testament, i.e. be translated into Greek and allow gentiles other than Jews to proclaim themselves "children of Israel". (Note: "Rabbi Yehuda the son of Rabbi Shalom said: Moses asked that the Mishnah be in written form [like the Torah]. But the Holy One, blessed be He, foresaw that the nations would get to translate the Torah and would read it in Greek, and declare: 'They aren't Israel.' God said to him [Moses] 'Behold, since in the future the nations will say 'We are Israel; we are the children of the Lord,' and Israel will say 'we are the children of the Lord' the scales would appear to be balanced [between the two claims]. The Holy One, blessed be He, will say to the nations: Why do you claim you are my children? I recognize as my child only the one who possesses my secret lore (mistinn i.e. mysteries). The nations will ask: And what is Your secret lore? God will reply: It is the Mishnah." (Gross 2017, p. 277, n. 61)) For much of the Geonic period, the Talmud was conserved primarily in oral transmission.

In his letter, Pirqoi ben Baboi remonstrated with the Kairouan community arguing that it was not sufficient to cite written texts in laying down Jewish law. The position of Yehudai Gaon was that applied halakhic rulings could not be made simply by citing halakha from the Tanakh, Mishna, or Talmud. The prescriptive authority of a Jewish law could only be vouchsafed if a living master ruled that it was known to be implemented in practice (halakhah le-ma'aseh). Written aide-mémoires from the oral tradition (nushaot), or from a megilat setarim (sequestered scroll), (Note: The Semitic root s-t-r suggests a written work kept out of sight, and the phrase was taken to mean in this era compilations of decided laws not accredited for public declamation (Fishman 2010, Fishman 2013, p. 52).) were devoid of cultural authority since they were not authorized, as were girsaot, by a master of the oral law linked to the chain of tradition. Pirqoi ben Baboi's construal of the relevant sugya in the Talmud is, however, arguably unique in inferring from the conditions set for making halakhah le-ma'aseh the idea that the only valid method for transmitting the Oral Torah must be itself oral. (Note: "The sugya discusses only whether certain methodologies are appropriate for deriving halakha le-ma'aseh when it is unknown. Deriving practical law from a conclusion which is itself already derived from Scripture or from the observation of the practices of others or by analogy to other practices is inappropriate, presumably because such rulings stand at a double remove from the authoritative source of Scripture." (Gross 2017, pp. 276–277))

The problem with Palestinian rabbis, in his view, was that in eliciting passages inscribed from the Mishna and Talmud, some of them "hidden" (genuzin), each imposed their personal interpretation upon them. The Babylonian practice exemplified by Yehudai Gaon was that Talmud legal teachings are validated only if they can be corroborated by living masters familiar with non-textual traditions, the chain of oral judgments, consensus and customary usage.

The Greek distinction whose impact is at work in these controversies was transmitted in a similar form to Islamic culture, where, after the establishment of the Qur'an text, there arose fierce opposition, particularly in areas best known for having by heart these stories, such as Basra and Kufa, to the inscription of the accompanying oral traditions. Scholars like Ibn Sa'd (784–845) vehemently argued that Muslims ought not to repeat what Islamic jurists conceived to be the theological error in Judaism, of writing down the Mathnā (i.e. the Mishna). Such practices would only invest teachers with an authority comparable to the foundational text of the Qur'an itself. This hostility to the written, as opposed to oral, recording of what Muhammad was remembered as having said, namely the ḥadīth, prevailed under the Umayyad Caliphate until Umar II (r. 717–720) ordered that an official compendium (tadwīn) of ḥadīth be made. Human memory was frail, and notes (atraf) had been made, but like nushaot, these were to remain secreted away.

Gregor Schoeler. analyzing fulminations impugning the Umayyad dynasty's legitimacy, correlated the genre hostile to the inscription of hadith with the fall of the Umayyads. They had broken a powerful taboo. The scholars frequently vindicated the Abbasid Caliphate which followed, and the new dynasty had empowered rule by Islamic jurists (fuqahā). Extrapolating from this, Talya Fishman wonders whether there is not some broad connection between this phenomenon in Islam and the remonstrations made by Yehudai Gaon and, later, Pirqoi ben Baboi. Jews outside of Eretz Israel called their Palestinian brethren Shami or "Damascenes", and the Babylonian school's hostility to Palestinian traditions might be embedded in a broader cultural battle, in which the Abbasids found themselves in rivalry with the Syro-Palestinian communities, in Umayyad territories to their west, around the Mediterranean.

== Prayer ==
Pirqoi ben Baboi was particularly concerned with prayer orthodoxy. He quotes his teacher Yehudai Gaon for an halakhic ban on non-Talmudic blessings, stating that unless a blessing is in the Talmud it may not be uttered, or modified even in a single letter. The Palestinian Jewish creation of piyyut came under intense fire as the geonic scholars strove to exercise their hegemony in terms of a correct halakhically defined liturgy. This remonstrance by the circle of Yehudai was shrugged off by the community in Palestine with their traditional dismissal: "minhag (custom) nullifies halakha" מנהג מבטל הלכה). (Note: This phrase occurs twice in the Jerusalem Talmud, where it is completely devoid of tendentiousness. However, later, in conflict with the assertive Geonic tradition, they apparently began to "brandish it as a slogan of cultural combat" and to vindicate the retention of local usage against centralized regimentation (Fishman 2013, p. 45).)

Like Yehudai, he was opposed to the recitation of the Shema in the Kedushah. Historically this innovation arose when, Jacob Mann opined, (Note: An ordinance to this effect by Heraclius is not attested, though Mann cites in support several earlier measures taken by Justinian that narrowed what Jews in synagogue worship could recite.) Heraclius, breaking a promise he had made to the Jews, wrested sway over Palestine from the Sassanian Persians and their former Jewish allies, and proscribed recitation of the daily Tefillah and Shema. Since they were allowed only to congregate in their synagogues on the morning of the Sabbath to recite the Amidah and associated piyyutim, the hazzan or precentor adopted the subterfuge of smuggling the banned prayer in, intoning the first and last lines of the Shema in such away as to slip by the eavesdropping of government officials monitoring the session. Ben Baboy repeated his stance of Yehudai that the raison d'être for such a novel practice had vanished with the Muslim conquest of the Levant. Therefore, it was necessary to remove the Shema from the kedushah of the Amidah during Shacharit prayer, since under Muslim rule it was now possible to return to the normal prayer practices in place prior to Christian rule. Pirqoy nonetheless did not require that the Shema be removed from the Mussaf Kedushah, a widespread Jewish ritual in Babylonia and one that also preserved an innovation made at a time of persecution.

== Sources ==
- Assaf, Simha; Derovan, David (2007). "Gaon". Encyclopaedia Judaica. Vol. 7 (2nd ed.). pp. 380–386. ISBN 978-0-02-865935-0.
- Bonfil, Robert (1983). "Tra due mondi: prospettive di ricerca sulla storia culturale degli Ebrei dell'Italia meridionale nell'alto Medioevo". Italia Judaica (in Italian). 1: 135–158.
- Bonfil, Robert (2009). History and Folklore in a Medieval Jewish Chronicle: The Family Chronicle of Aḥima'az Ben Paltiel. Brill. ISBN 978-9-004-17385-9.
- Epstein, J. N. (1922). "Sur les "Chapitres" de Ben Baboi". Revue des Études Juives (in French). 75 (150): 179–186. doi:10.3406/rjuiv.1922.5381.
- Fishman, Talya (2010). "Guarding Oral Transmission: Within and Between Cultures Oral Tradition" (PDF). Oral Tradition. 25 (1): 41–56. doi:10.1353/ort.2010.a402423.
- Fishman, Talya (2013). Becoming the People of the Talmud: Oral Torah as Written Tradition in Medieval Jewish Culture. University of Pennsylvania Press. ISBN 978-0-812-22287-6.
- Gafni, Isaiah (1997). Land, Center and Diaspora: Jewish Constructs in Late Antiquity. A&C Black. ISBN 978-1-850-75644-6.
- Gross, Simcha M. (May 2017). Empire and Neighbors: Babylonian Jewish Identity in its Local and Imperial Context (pdf) (Thesis). ProQuest 1952112334.
- Horbury, William (April 1982). "The Benediction of the "Minim" and Early Jewish-Christian Controversy". The Journal of Theological Studies. 33 (1): 19–61. doi:10.1093/jts/XXXIII.1.19. JSTOR 23957556.
- Horovitz, Josef (2007). "Pirkoi ben Baboi". Encyclopaedia Judaica. Vol. 16 (2nd ed.). p. 183. ISBN 978-0-02-865944-2.
- Horovitz, Josef (2007). "Geonic Literature". Encyclopaedia Judaica. Vol. 7 (2nd ed.). pp. 491–494. ISBN 978-0-02-865935-0.
- Keim, Katharina E. (2016). 'Pirqei deRabbi Eliezer': Structure, Coherence, Intertextuality. Brill. ISBN 978-9-004-33312-3.
- Langer, Ruth (1998). To Worship God Properly: Tensions Between Liturgical Custom and Halakhah in Judaism. Hebrew Union College Press. ISBN 978-0-878-20103-7.
- Langer, Ruth (2011). Cursing the Christians?: A History of the Birkat HaMinim. Oxford University Press. ISBN 978-0-199-78317-5.
- Mann, Jacob (1920). "Les "chapitres" de Ben Baboi et les relations de R. Yehoudai Gaon avec la Palestine". Revue des Études Juives (in French). 70 (140): 113–148. doi:10.3406/rjuiv.1920.5272.
- Mann, Jacob (1927). "Changes in the Divine Service of the Synagogue due to Religious Persecutions". Hebrew Union College Annual. 4: 242–310. JSTOR 23502835.
