= Ruth Langer =

Ruth Langer may refer to:

- Ruth Langer (scholar), professor of theology
- Ruth Langer (swimmer) (born 1921), Austrian swimmer
