= Bella bat R. Jakob Perlhefter =

Bella bat Jakob Perlhefter (Isabell, Bilah, born c. 1650 in Prague, Holy Roman Empire, now Czech Republic; died 1710 in Prague) was a professional Hebrew letter writer, businesswoman and instructor of music. She corresponded with her husband Behr Perlhefter and with the Christian polymath Johann Christoph Wagenseil in Hebrew. She wrote the preface of the Yiddish book “Beer Sheva” (Seven Springs).
