= Hiyya Rofe =

Rabbi

Hiyya Rofe (Hebrew: חייא רופא; d. 1620) was rabbi of Safed. Having studied Talmud under Solomon Sagis and Cabala under Hayyim Vital, Hiyya was ordained in accordance with the old system ("semikah") reintroduced into Palestine by Jacob Berab. In 1612 Hiyya gave his approbation to Issachar Baer Eylenburg's "Be'er Sheba'." Most of Hiyya's works have been lost; the remainder were published by his son, Meïr Rofe, under the title "Ma'aseh Ḥiyya" (Venice, 1652), containing novellæ on several of the Talmudic treatises, and twenty-seven responsa. These were revised by Moses Zacuto, who added a preface.
