= Abraham Rovigo =

Abraham Rovigo (born ca. 1650 in Modena, died 1713 in Mantua) was a Jewish scholar, rabbi and kabbalist.

== Biography ==
Rovigo studied in Venice in the yeshiva of Moses Zacuto and devoted himself to study the Kabbalah. He was one of the main supporters in Livorno of the moderate wing of the Sabbatean movement, and gathered around him several important followers of Sabbatai Zevi, such as Behr Perlhefter, Mordechai Mokiach and Mordechai Ashkenazi. In 1700–1701 he spent one year in Fürth, in order to proofread and manage the publishing of the manuscripts of the Zoharic commentary of his pupil Mordecai Ashkenazi. One year later, he and a group of followers settled in the Holy Land.

Rovigo came from a wealthy Modena family, and was dedicated throughout his entire life to studying, collecting, and publishing Kabbalistic manuscripts. He was a close friend of Benjamin ben Eliezer Ha-Kohen Vitale of Reggio with whom he had studied Kabbalah in Venice under Moses Zacuto. Scholem also mentions in several places the correspondence about Sabbatean affairs he maintained with Meir bar Hiyya Rofe between the years 1674 and 1678 as a very important source for the history of the Sabbatean movement.

== Bibliography ==
- Gershom Scholem: Halomotav shel ha-Shabbetai R. Mordechai Ashkenazi. Jerusalem 1938.
- Abraham Yaari: Iggerot Ereẓ Yisrael. Jerusalem 1943, pp. 223–242.
- Yeshaya Tishby: Netivei Emunah u-Minut. Jerusalem 1964, cf. Index.
- Raphael Patai (1990). The Hebrew Goddess. Wayne State University Press. p. 209. ISBN 978-0-8143-2271-0.
