= Behr Perlhefter =

Behr Shmuel Issachar Leyb ben Judah Moses Eybeschuetz Perlhefter (c. 1650 in Prague, Holy Roman Empire – after 1713 in Prague) was a Jewish scholar and rabbi. His educated wife Bella bat R. Jakob Perlhefter (Isabell, Bella, Bilah, died 1710 in Prague), corresponded in Hebrew and wrote the preface on the Yiddish book “Beer Sheva”. Perlhefter taught the German Christian Hebraist Johann Christoph Wagenseil Hebrew and Jewish literature. Beer Perlhefter is considered an important figure of the Sabbatian movement. After the death of the pseudo-Messiah Sabbatai Zevi (1626-1676), he restored the Sabbatian theology at the school of Abraham Rovigo and called the Pseudomessiah Mordecai Mokiach to Italy.
