= Meir bar Hiyya Rofe =

Meir bar Hiyya Rofe (17th century; the Encyclopaedia Judaica article gives the years of 1610 and 1690 as the possible years of birth and death respectively) was a Hebron rabbi, known among other things for his tours of Europe as an emissary from the Holy Land on behalf of the Jewish community of Hebron. His father, Hiyya Rofe, was a very learned rabbi from Safed. Orphaned at a young age, Meir studied in Hebron, leaving about 1648 as an emissary to Italy, Holland, and Germany. On his return journey, he stayed for two years in Italy to publish Ma'aseh Ḥiyya (Venice, 1652), his father's talmudic novellae and responsa. In Amsterdam he had influenced the wealthy Abraham Pereyra to found a yeshiva in Hebron to be called Hesed le-Avraham, of which Meir himself became the head scholar.

Meir was in Gaza in 1665 when Nathan of Gaza began to prophecy on the messianism of Sabbatai Zevi. In a subsequent letter to Amsterdam, to Abraham Pereyra, he wrote that "Nathan of Gaza is a wise man fit for the divine presence to rest upon him," and urged Pereyra to come to Gaza. Pereyra reached Venice, but returned to Holland. Meir maintained his belief even after Sabbatai's conversion in 1666. In 1672 Meir left, again as an emissary of Hebron, for Turkey. He stayed for a time in Adrianople, where he was in contact with Sabbatai. On Sabbatai's exile to Albania in 1673, Meir returned to Gaza where he stayed with Nathan and even copied his writings for his own use. He then traveled again to Italy, and from 1675 to 1678 resided in the home of the Sabbatean Abraham Rovigo in Modena. Throughout his stay in Italy Meir did much to encourage those who believed in Sabbatai Zevi and spread the writings of Nathan of Gaza. During the last ten years of his life he was recognized as the outstanding scholar of Hebron.

Meir Rofe persisted in his Sabbatean faith long after Sabbatai's apostasy, and even after Sabbatai's death. Scholem also mentions in several places the correspondence about Sabbatean affairs he maintained with Abraham Rovigo between the years 1674 and 1678 as a very important source for the history of the Sabbatean movement.
