= Steven Fine =

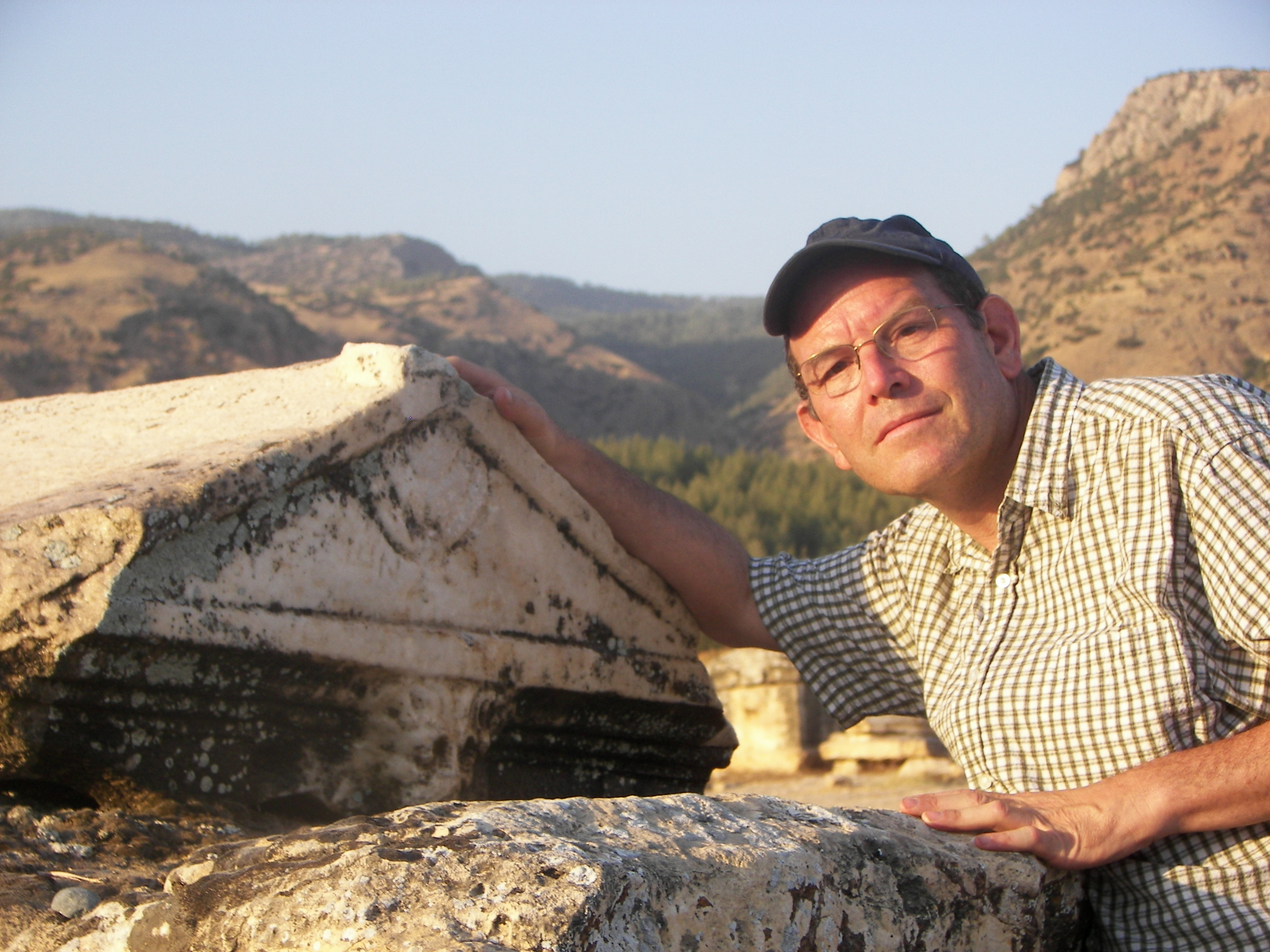
- Courtesy of Yeshiva University
- Born: 1958 (age 67–68); Rochester, NY
- Employer: Yeshiva University
- Title: Distinguished Professor, Dr. Pinkhos Churgin Professor of Jewish History, Director of the Yeshiva University Center for Israel Studies, the Arch of Titus Digital Restoration Project and the Israelite Samaritans Project.
- Website: yeshiva.academia.edu/StevenFine

Steven Fine is a cultural historian specializing in 'Judaism in the Greco-Roman World’. He is a Yeshiva University Distinguished Professor and Churgin Professor of Jewish History at Yeshiva University.

== Education ==
Fine received a BA in Religious Studies from University of California, Santa Barbara in 1979, an MA in Art History and Museum Studies from the University of Southern California in 1984, and a PhD in Jewish History from Hebrew University of Jerusalem in 1993.

== Career ==
Fine began his career as an intern in the Departments of Jewish Art and Jewish Folklore at the Israel Museum (1977–8, 1980–81) under the direction of Bezalel Narkiss, in the Department of Indian Art of the Los Angeles County Museum of Art (1982–3, under the tutelage of Pratapaditya Pal), and then as founding curator of the USC Archaeological Research Collection (1983-87 under the tutelage of Bruce Zuckerman).

After completing his doctorate in Jerusalem, Fine served as assistant and associate professor at Baltimore Hebrew University (1994–2000), and then as Jewish Foundation Professor of Judaic Studies at the University of Cincinnati from 2000 to 2005.

Steven Fine joined the faculty of Yeshiva University in 2005 as Professor of Jewish History and served as chair of the Department of Jewish History at Yeshiva College. In 2015 he was awarded the Dean Pinkhos Churgin Chair of Jewish History, and in 2025 was appointed YU Distinguished Professor. He is the Founding Director of the Yeshiva University Center for Israel Studies and the Arch of Titus Project.

=== Arch of Titus and Israelite Samaritans Projects ===
Fine is the head of the Arch of Titus Digital Restoration Project. The team discovered original yellow ochre paint that was originally on the temple menorah at the arch.

Fine has debunked the modern urban myth that the ancient menorah from the Temple in Jerusalem is in Vatican City.

The YU Israelite Samaritans Project included a documentary entitled The Sanmaritans: A Biblical People, an exhibition at the Museum of the Bible and an accompanying book.

== Books ==
- Sacred Realm: The Emergence of the Synagogue in the Ancient World, editor and author of the major essay. New York: Oxford University Press and Yeshiva University Museum, 1996, best book in its category, Society of Architectural Historians.
- This Holy Place: On the Sanctity of the Synagogue During the Greco-Roman Period, Christianity and Judaism in Antiquity Series, Notre Dame, Ind.: University of Notre Dame Press, 1997.
- Jews, Christians and Polytheists in the Ancient Synagogue: Cultural Interaction During the Greco-Roman Period, Proceedings of a conference organized by Baltimore Hebrew University, May, 1997, edited by S. Fine, London: Routledge Press, 1999. Finalist, 1999 National Jewish Book Award, Charles H. Revson Foundation Award in Jewish-Christian Relations.
- A Crown for a King: Studies in Memory of Prof. Stephen S. Kayser, edited by S. Fine, W. Kramer, S. Sabar, Berkeley: Magnes Museum Press and Jerusalem: Gefen, 2000.
- Art and Judaism in the Greco-Roman World: Toward a New "Jewish Archaeology, Cambridge and New York: Cambridge University Press, 2005. Second revised edition, 2010, Joshua Schnitzer Book Award by the Association for Jewish Studies (2009)
- Liturgy in the Life of the Synagogue: Studies in the History of Jewish Public Prayer, edited by Steven Fine and Ruth Langer. Duke Judaic Studies Series. Series editor, E. M. Meyers. Winona Lake, Ind.: Eisenbrauns, 2005.
- The Temple of Jerusalem: From Moses to the Messiah: In Honor of Professor Louis H. Feldman. Boston: Brill, 2011.
- Puzzling Out the Past: Studies in Near Eastern Epigraphy and Archaeology in Honor of Bruce Zuckerman. Eds. S. Fine, M. Lundberg, D. Pardee, Boston: Brill Academic Press, 2012.
- Art, History and the Historiography of Judaism in Roman Antiquity. Boston: Brill Academic Press, 2012.
- Shoshannat Yaakov: Studies in Honor of Professor Yaakov Elman, eds. Shai Secunda and Steven Fine, Brill, 2012.
- ‘’Talmuda de-Eretz Israel: Archaeology and the Rabbis in Late Antique Palestine.’’ with Aaron Koller, Berlin: De Gruyters, 2014.
- The Menorah: From the Bible to Modern Israel. Cambridge, MA: Harvard University Press, 2016.
- ‘’Jewish Religious Architecture: From Biblical Israel to Modern Judaism’’ Boston: Brill, 2019.
- ‘’Text, Tradition and the History of Second Temple and Rabbinic Judaism: Studies in Honor of Professor Lawrence H. Schiffman.’’ eds. Stuart S. Miller, Michael Swartz, Steven Fine, Naomi Grunhaus, Alex Jassen. Boston: Brill, 2020.
- ‘’The Arch of Titus: From Rome to Jerusalem-- and Back.’’ Exhibition volume, Brill, and Yeshiva University Press, 2021.
- ‘’The Samaritans: A Biblical People.’’ Exhibition volume, Brill and Yeshiva University Press, 2022.
