= Mordecai Mokiach =

Sabbatean prophet and Messiah claimant

Mordecai Mokiach (Eisenstadt, also Mordechai Ben Hayyim of Eisenstadt) (c. 1650 in Alsace – May 18, 1729 in Pressburg) was a Jewish Sabbatean prophet and Messiah claimant.

The death of Sabbatai Zevi (1676) seems to have encouraged his followers, who claimed that he had returned to his heavenly abode and would come back in three years to finish his "Messianic" task. This doctrine was preached by Mordecai, who, through his ascetic life, his eloquence, and his commanding appearance, won many followers. Italian kabbalists, among them Behr Perlhefter, the first Maggid in the study hall of Abraham Rovigo, and Benjamin ben Eliezer ha-Kohen, rabbi of Reggio, called him to Italy about 1678, where he was very popular for a time. Something, perhaps fear of the Inquisition, forced him to leave Italy, where he had begun to announce himself as the Messiah. He traveled as a preacher through Austria, Germany, and Poland, and finally returned to Hungary, where he seems to have lived a quiet life, as nothing further is known of him. His son, Judah Löb Mokiach, an eminent Talmudist, died in Pressburg on December 7, 1742; the latter's sons were David Berlin (Mokiach) and Isaiah Berlin (Mokiach), known also as Isaiah Pick.
