= Alfred Schmidtke =

German New Testament scholar

Alfred Schmidtke was a German New Testament scholar. As a collaborator of Hermann von Soden he worked on Greek uncial codices of the New Testament. Schmidtke travelled, investigating the libraries of monasteries in Albania and Macedonia on von Soden's behalf. In 1903, after a "long stay" at Mount Athos, he published a description of the monastic republic there. In 1907, he assisted in the publication of the Paris uncial. In 1911, his work on the manuscripts of the Jewish Christian Gospels was published. There is no further record of him after the outbreak of World War I.

== Works ==
- Das Klosterland des Athos, 1903
- Die Evangelien eines alten Unzialcodex nach einer Abschrift des Dreizehnten Jahrunderts, 1903
- Neue Fragmente und Untersuchungen zu den judenchristlichen Evangelien, Leipzig 1911
