= Chukot Akum =

Prohibition in Judaism of imitating Gentile manners

Chukot Akum or Chukat Ha'Akum is a prohibition in Judaism of imitating Gentile manners in their dressings and practices. The prohibition comes from the Torah commandment "You shall not follow gentile customs" (Leviticus 20:23). Modern life has created many dilemmas on what constitutes a violation of this prohibition and there is ongoing debate about this topic, such as discussions on whether a Jew can attend Thanksgiving dinner or Mother's Day observance without violating this prohibition.

== Origin ==
The Torah prohibits Jews from imitating the customs of the Gentiles (Leviticus 20:23) . However it does not clearly specify what customs would be called gentile customs.

The Talmud deals with this topic in Avodah Zora 11a when it describes the gentile custom of burning the bed of a king after he has died. In Sanhedrin 52b similar debate is raised about Gentile custom of beheading criminals with a sword. Both of these mentions believe that burning a king's bed or beheading a criminal do not violate the Torah commandment since these acts are not specifically gentile laws and customs.

Rambam wrote about this topic :

The Jew should be distinguished from them (Gentiles) and distinct in his dress and his actions just as he is distinguished from them in his knowledge and his understanding.

Maharik believed that the gentile customs that are prohibited are those who have no inherent justification because they are suspected of being related to gentile religions. The second category of prohibited customs are those that depart a Jew from humble ways that a Jew should conduct himself. Thus Maharik believed that the Talmudic discussion about burning a king's bed has a logical explanation and is therefore excluded from biblical prohibition.

Sefer ha-Chinuch writes about this topic:

One who separates himself from all gentile behavior and mannerism and applies all his thought and his heart to G-d, to understand his wondrous ways, is rewarded in that his soul will abide with all that is good and his seed will inherit the earth.

== In modern life ==
The majority of the opinion believes that the biblical prohibition is about all non-Jews. However, Halacha does not consider Islam as idolatry and therefore Muslims are not subjected to the prohibition. Regardless of whether Christianity is idolatrous, almost all rabbis believe that following Christian customs falls within the biblical prohibitions.

The commandment for not shaving the beard originated in the Torah command for Jews to be separated from Gentile priests who shaved in according to their religious laws. However, some modern Halachic authorities believe that growing a beard or following modern fashion trends do not necessarily separate the Jew from the gentile in modern societies.
