= Dan Jaffé =

Franco-Israeli historian of religions

- Hebrew: דן יפה
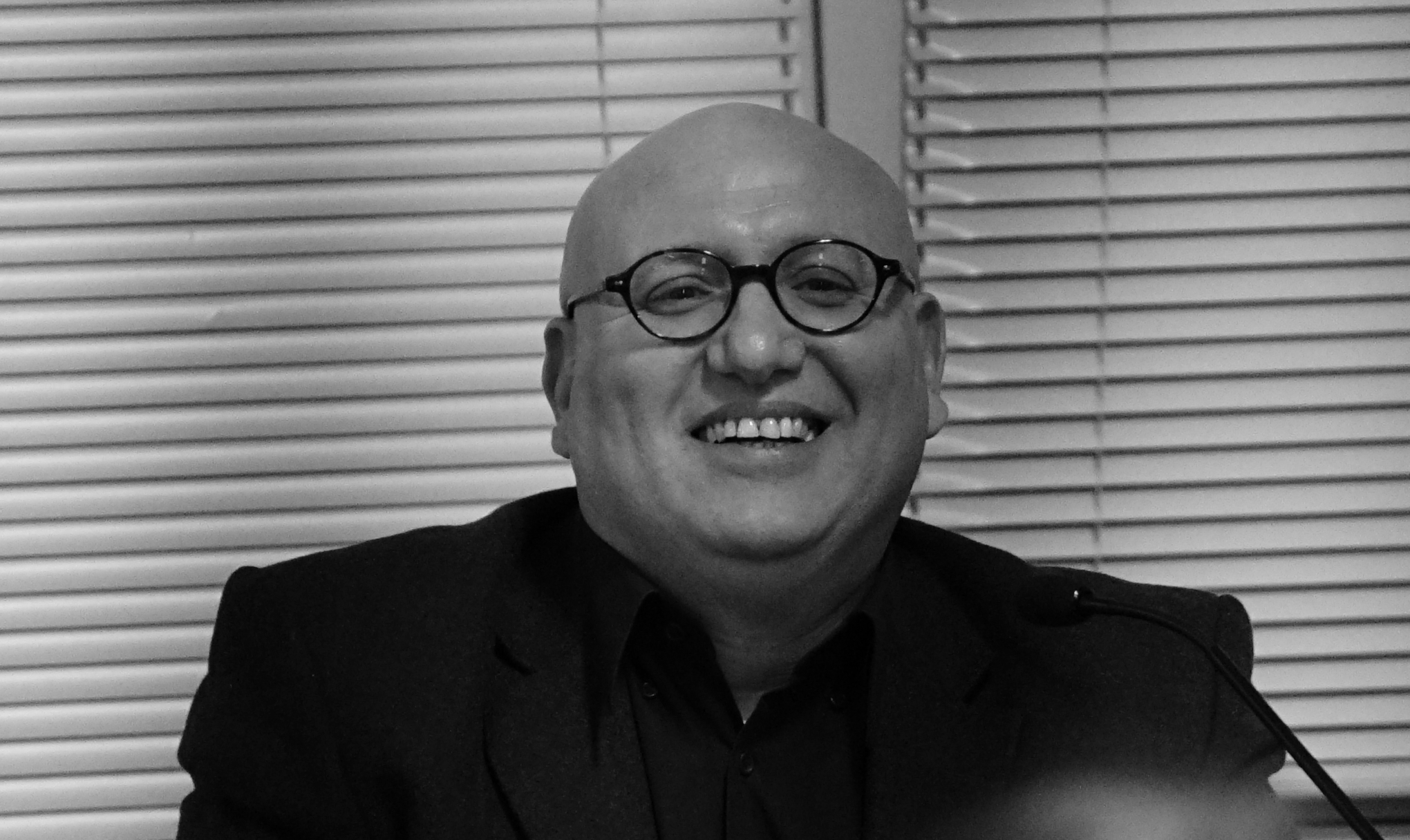
- Born: 1970 (age 55–56)

Academic background
- Education: Bar-Ilan University; University of Paris X
- Thesis: Orthodoxie et hétérodoxie dans le judaïsme ancien : Judéo-Chrétiens et Amei-Ha-Aretz dans la littérature juive des premiers siècles

Academic work
- Discipline: history of religions
- Institutions: Bar-Ilan University; Ashkelon Academic College; CNRS
- Main interests: relations between Rabbinic Judaism and Early Christianity

Dan Jaffé (Hebrew: דן יפה; born in 1970) is a Franco-Israeli specialist in the history of religions and teaches at Bar-Ilan University (Tel-Aviv) and Ashkelon Academic College. He is a researcher attached to the CNRS. His work focuses on the Jewish world in the first centuries of the Common Era, the Talmud and the origins of Christianity. He has published extensively on relations between Rabbinic Judaism and Early Christianity. He directs the collection Judaïsme ancien et christianisme primitif published by Éditions du Cerf.

== Life ==
=== Education ===
In 1998 Jaffé earned a Masters Degree at Bar-Ilan University. From 2004 he holds a PhD in Studies and History of Religion from the University of Paris X with the thesis entitled Orthodoxie et hétérodoxie dans le judaïsme ancien : Judéo-Chrétiens et Amei-Ha-Aretz dans la littérature juive des premiers siècles . He also studied at the École Pratique des Hautes Études in the religious sciences section.

=== Teaching ===
From 2005 Jaffé is lecturer at the Institut de science et théologie des religions of Marseille and at the Institut d'études et de culture juives of Aix-en-Provence. From 2006 he is professor at the Helene & Paul Shulman School for Basic Jewish Studies of the Faculty of Jewish studies of the Bar-Ilan university at Ramat-Gan, Israel. In 2020 he become Administration of Regional Colleges at the Bar-Ilan university.

== Works ==
=== Thesis ===
- Jaffé, Dan (2004). Orthodoxie et hétérodoxie dans le judaïsme ancien : Judéo-Chrétiens et Amei-Ha-Aretz dans la littérature juive des premiers siècles (PhD diss. University of Paris X thesis). OCLC 494513054.

=== Books ===
- Le judaïsme et l’avènement du christianisme. Orthodoxie et hétérodoxie dans la littérature talmudique, Ier-IIe siècle, Editions du Cerf, Collection « Patrimoines judaïsme », Paris, 2005, 484 p.
- Le Talmud et les origines juives du christianisme. Jésus, Paul et les judéo-chrétiens dans la littérature talmudique, Editions du Cerf, Collection « Initiations bibliques », Paris, 2007, 227 p.
- Italian traduction: Il Talmud e le origini ebraiche del Cristianesimo. Gesù, Paolo e i Giudeocristiani nella Litteratura Talmudica, Editions Jaca Book, Milan, 2008, 229 p.
- Spanish traduction: El Talmud y los origenes judios del Cristianismo. Jesus, Pablo y los judeo-cristianos en la literatura talmudica, Editions Desclée de Brouwer, Bilbao, 2009, 235p.
- Jésus sous la plume des historiens juifs du XXe siècle. Approche historique, perspectives historiographiques, analyses méthodologiques, Editions du Cerf, Collection « Patrimoines judaïsme », Paris, 2009, 412 p.
- Italian traduction: Gesù l’ebreo. Gesù di Nazaret negli sritti degli storici ebrei des XX secolo, Editions Jaca Book, Milan, 2013, 432p.
- Jaffé, D., ed. (2010). Studies in Rabbinic Judaism and Early Christianity. Text and Context. Ancient Judaism and Early Christianity. Vol. 74. Leiden/Boston: E. J. Brill.
- Essai sur l’interprétation et la culture talmudiques. Femmes et familles dans le Talmud, Editions du Cerf, Collection « Patrimoines judaïsme », Paris, 2013, 253 p.
- Les identités en formation. Rabbis, hérésies, premiers chrétiens, Edition du Cerf, Collection « Judaïsme ancien et Christianisme Primitif », Paris, 2018, 558 p.
- Jaffé D., (éd.), Juifs et chrétiens aux premiers siècles. Identités, dialogues et dissidences, Editions du Cerf, Collection « Judaïsme ancien et Christianisme Primitif », Paris, 2019, 771p.
- Jaffé D., Nir R., Teppler Y., (eds.), Reflections on Judaism and Christianity in Antiquity, Editions Peter Lang, Brussels, 2021, 366 p.
