= Israel Yuval =

Israeli historian

Israel Jacob Yuval (Hebrew: ישראל יעקב יובל; born October 1, 1949, in Sde Eliyahu, a religious Kibbutz south of Beit She'an) is an Israeli academic who is Professor of Jewish History at the Hebrew University of Jerusalem. He is also the founder of Scholion - Interdisciplinary research center in the Humanities and Jewish Studies.

Yuval is the academic director of the Jack, Joseph and Morton Mandel School of Advanced Studies in the Humanities, and the Teddy Kollek Chair for the Study of Cultural Aspects of Vienna and Jerusalem.

== Career ==
From 1998 to 2008, Yuval was responsible for the research project Germania-Judaica. In 2002 he founded Scholion and was its director until 2010. Between 2011 and 2012 he was a co-editor of the Tarbiẕ journal.

Yuval's works have argued that the confrontation with Christianity is the driving force behind Judaism in the time of Midrash and Talmud.

== Works ==
- Scholars in Their Time: The Religious Leadership of German Jewry in the Late Middle Ages (Magnes 1988); won the Zalman Shazar Award for Jewish History
- Two Nations in Your Womb: Perceptions of Jews and Christians in Late Antiquity and the Middle Ages (Am Oved 2000); won the Bialik Award and the Pierre A. Bernheim Award of the Académie des Inscriptions et Belles-Lettres
