= Johann Christoph Wagenseil =

German historian, Orientalist, jurist and Christian Hebraist

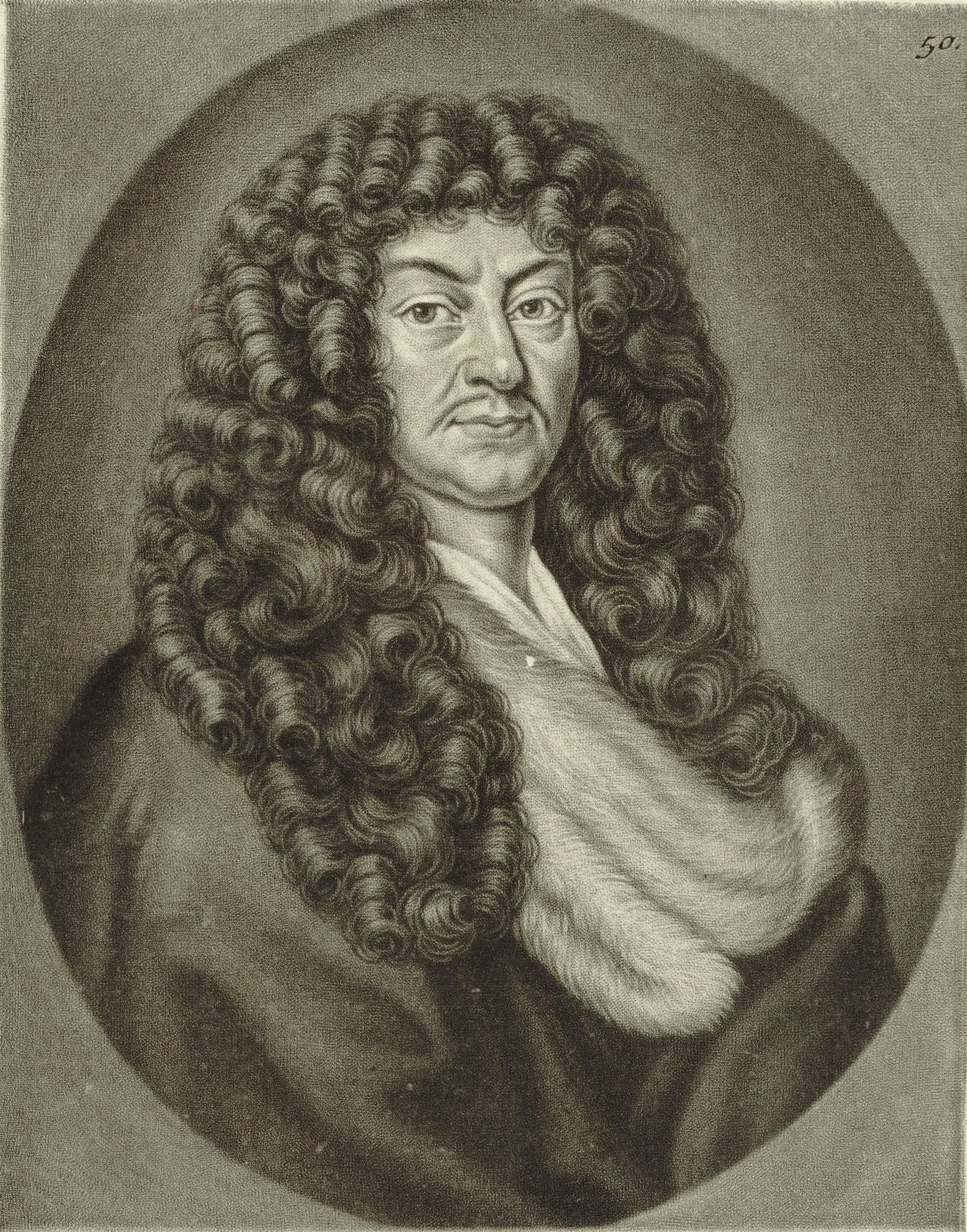

Johann Christoph Wagenseil (26 November 1633, Nuremberg – 9 October 1705, Altdorf) was a German historian, Orientalist, jurist and Christian Hebraist.

== Life and career ==
Wagenseil was born in Nuremberg on 26 November 1633. As a youth he was educated at Stockholm, Greifswald, and Rostock. In 1649 he entered the University of Altdorf. He traveled widely in Europe and became a member of numerous scholarly societies. In 1665 he received a doctorate of law at the University of Orleans. In 1667 he was made professor of history and civil law at Altdorf and then served professor of Oriental languages at the same university from 1674 to 1697. After 1667 he occupied the chair of ecclesiastical law until his death on 9 October 1705. Wagenseil twice served as deacon and rector at Altdorf and in 1699 he was named the university librarian.

For his knowledge of Hebrew he was chiefly indebted to the Sabbatean Behr Perlhefter and Enoch Levi, who had come from Vienna to Fürth around 1670.

[N.B. While some of Wagenseil's later studies may have occurred with "the Sabbatean Behr Perlhefter and Enoch Levi, when they came from Vienna to Fürth around 1670" as mentioned in the preceding passage, by this time Wagenseil already was an accomplished Hebrew/talmud scholar. Indeed, in "Die Letzte Vertreibung der Juden aus Wien und Niederösterreich" Kaufmann expands on the subject of how Wagenseil, while still aged in his early 20s stayed for extended periods in the Vienna Jewish community where in particular he befriended and studied under Dr. Jehuda Löb Winkler as well as Rabbi Model Oettingen, thereafter maintaining correspondence with both of them from all the locations and university cities where he later resided as preceptor of the Kaiser's sons, as well as throughout ensuing years.]

Wagenseil devoted his learning to publishing anti-Christian works of Jewish authors and undertook long journeys to gather his material and conduct research. He died in Altdorf in 1705.

== Works ==
The fruit of Wagenseil's travels was the collection Tela Ignea Satanæ, sive Arcani et Horribiles Judæorum Adversus Christum, Deum, et Christianam Religionem Libri (Altdorf, 1681), which included the apologetic Ḥizzuḳ Emunah of the Karaite Isaac Troki.

Becoming convinced by the Toledot Yeshu that the Jews were guilty of blaspheming Jesus, Wagenseil addressed to all high potentates his Denunciatio Christiana de Blasphemiis Judæorum in Jesum Christum (Altdorf, 1703), in which he implored them to restrain the Jews from mocking Jesus, Mary, the cross, the mass, and Christian teachings. He was opposed to forcible baptism and similar conversion measures, and devoted a treatise to the refutation of the charge of ritual murder.

Wagenseil wrote, besides the above-mentioned books, Hoffnung der Erlösung Israels (Leipzig, 1705), which appeared in a second edition (Altdorf, 1707), augmented by a number of smaller works under the general title Benachrichtigungen Wegen Einiger die Gemeine Jüdischheit Betreffenden Sachen. This collection contains the following treatises:

1. "Quomodo cum Judæo in Colloquio, Forte Fortuno Nato, Agendum"
2. "Judæos non Uti Sanguine Christiano"
3. "Quomodo Usura Judæorum Averti Possit"
4. "De Precatione Judaica Olenu"
5. "Denunciatio Christiana de Blasphemiis Judæorum in Jesum Christum"
6. "Apologia"
7. "Denunciatio ad Magistratus Christianos de Juribus Eorum a Judæis Violatis"
8. "An Christianus Salva Religione Judæo Die Sabbati Inservire Possit."

He also wrote:

- "Exercitationes Sex Varii Argumenti" (Altdorf, 1698)
- "Belehrung der Jüdisch-Deutschen Red- und Schreibart" (2d ed., Königsberg, 1699)
- "Disputatio Circularis de Judæis" (Altdorf, 1705)
- "Rabbi Moses Stendal's nach Jüdischer Rede-Art Vorlängst in Reimen Gebrachte Psalmen David's" (Leipzig, 1700);

As well as an edition and Latin translation of the Talmudic treatise Sotah (Altdorf, 1674).

He was also the earliest researcher of the German Meistersinger tradition. His Latin history of Nuremberg De civitate noribergensi commentatio (Altdorf, 1697) included the German appendix Buch von der Meister-Singer holdseligen Kunst Anfang, Fortübung, Nutzbarkeiten, und Lehrsätzen (dated 1680), which discussed the origin of the guild, their Tabulaturen and customs. It also includes music examples by Müglin, Heinrich Frauenlob, Der Marner and Barthel Regenbogen. Though its accuracy has been doubted since the time of its publication, it remains an important account and formed the basis of accounts by Jean Paul and E. T. A. Hoffmann, as well as Richard Wagner's opera Die Meistersinger von Nürnberg.
