= William Horbury =

Former professor of Jewish and Early Christian Studies

William Horbury (born 1942) is a Church of England priest and former professor of Jewish and Early Christian Studies at Cambridge University.

== Academic career ==
William Horbury graduated BA from Oriel College, Oxford in 1964 and entered Westcott House, Cambridge for ordination training in the same year. He was ordained deacon in 1969 and priest in 1970, having become a fellow of Clare College, Cambridge in 1968. He completed his Cambridge PhD thesis, "A Critical Examination of the Toledoth Jeshu" in 1971.

From 1972 to 1978 he served as Rector of Great and Little Gransden in the Diocese of Ely. In 1978 he became a fellow of Corpus Christi College, Cambridge and is now a life fellow. He became a lecturer in the Faculty of Divinity in Cambridge in 1984 and Professor of Jewish and Early Christian Studies in 1998. He is now retired. He also served as honorary priest in charge of St Botolph's Church, Cambridge from 1990 to 2014.

He became a Fellow of the British Academy in 1997.

== Selected publications ==
- Suffering and Martyrdom in the New Testament: Studies Presented to G. M. Styler by the Cambridge New Testament Seminar (Cambridge University Press, 1981) (edited, with Brian McNeil)
- Templum Amicitiae: Essays on the Second Temple Presented to Ernst Bammel (JSOT press, 1991) (edited)
- Jewish Inscriptions of Graeco-Roman Egypt (Cambridge University Press, 1992) (coauthored with D. E. Noy)
- Jewish Messianism and the Cult of Christ (SCM, 1998)
- Jews and Christians in Contact and Controversy (T. & T. Clark, 1998) (collected essays)
- Messianism among Jews and Christians (Continuum, 2003)
- Herodian Judaism and New Testament Study (Mohr Siebeck, 2006)
