= Ruth Langer (scholar) =

American scholar and theologian

Ruth Langer is a Professor of Theology at Boston College, and an expert on Jewish Liturgy and on Christian Jewish Relations.

== Education ==
Langer was educated at Hebrew Union College - Jewish Institute of Religion, where she received her Ph.D. (1994), MAHL (1985), and Rabbinic Ordination (1986), as well as at Bryn Mawr College (AB 1981).

== Positions ==
=== History of liturgy ===
Langer takes the position that the liturgy developed gradually and over many centuries and that during that period of development, when rabbinic authority differed from popular custom on questions of liturgy, the liturgy always followed popular custom. Langer's analysis of the development of the Torah service is widely noted.

=== Jewish-Christian relations ===
In criticizing some parts of the Christian liturgy seen as anti-Jewish, Langer has explained that the Jewish liturgy does not include anti-Christian prayers.

== Personal life ==
She is married to Jonathan Sarna.

== Writings ==
=== Books ===
- Cursing the Christians?: A History of the Birkat HaMinim (New York: Oxford University Press, 2012)
- Liturgy in the Life of the Synagogue: Studies in the History of Jewish Prayer, ed. Ruth Langer and Steven Fine (Winona Lake, Indiana: Eisenbrauns, 2005)
- To Worship God Properly: Tensions between Liturgical Custom and Halakhah in Judaism (Cincinnati: Hebrew Union College Press, 1998)

=== Publications ===
- "A Jewish Response," in Sic et Non: Encountering Dominus Iesus, ed. Stephen J Pope and Charles Hefling (Maryknoll: Orbis Books, 2002)
- "Liturgy and Sensory Experience," in Christianity in Jewish Terms, ed. Tikva Frymer-Kensky, David Novak, Peter Ochs, David Fox Sandmel, Michael A. Signer (Westview Press, 2000), 189–195, 386–7.
- "Revisiting Early Rabbinic Liturgy: The Recent Contributions of Ezra Fleischer," Prooftexts 19:2 (1999): 179–204; and "Considerations of Method: A Response to Ezra Fleischer," Prooftexts 20:3 (2000): 384–387.
- "From Study of Scripture to a Reenactment of Sinai," Worship 72:1 (January 1998): 43–67.
- "Birkat Betulim: A Study of the Jewish Celebration of Bridal Virginity," Proceedings of the American Academy for Jewish Research LXI (1995): 53–94.
- “Biblical Texts in Jewish Prayers: Their History and Function,” in a volume of papers from a conference in November 2005 in Aachen, Germany (Brill).
- “The Earliest Texts of the Birkat Haminim”, with Uri Ehrlich, forthcoming in Hebrew Union College Annual 77.
- “Telling the Catholic Story of Covenant in the Presence of Jews: A Response to Rev. Lawrence Frizzell” forthcoming in a JPII Cultural Center publication.
- “Liturgy,” forthcoming in the Encyclopaedia Judaica, revised edition.
- “From Study of Scripture to a Reenactment of Sinai: The Emergence of the Synagogue Torah Service,” reprinted in the Journal of Synagogue Music 31:1 (Fall 2006): 104–125.
- A Dictionary of Jewish-Christian Relations, edited by Edward Kessler and Neil Wenborn (Cambridge University Press, 2005), entries on "Amidah" (pp. 12–13), "Birkat Hamazon" (pp. 59–60), "Birkat Haminim" (p. 60), "Bread" (p. 64), "Candle" (p. 75), "Intercessions" (p. 210), "Wine" (pp. 445–446).
- “Sinai, Zion, and God in the Synagogue: Celebrating Torah in Ashkenaz,” in Liturgy in the Life of the Synagogue: Studies in the History of Jewish Prayer, ed. Ruth Langer and Steven Fine (Winona Lake, Indiana: Eisenbrauns, 2005), 121–159.
- “Hanukkah: A Holiday of Witness” in Preach (November/December 2005): 24–26.
- “Worship and Devotional Life: Jewish Worship,” in the Encyclopedia of Religion (second edition, 2005), 14:9805-9809.
- “The Liturgical Writings of J. Leonard Levy: The Judaism of an American Reform Rabbi,” in Pursuing Peace Across the Alleghenies: The Rodef Shalom Congregation, Pittsburgh, Pennsylvania, 1856–2005, edited by Walter Jacob (Pittsburgh: Rodef Shalom Press, 2005), 201–230.
- “Theologies of Self and Other in Jewish Liturgies,” CCAR Journal: A Reform Jewish Quarterly (Winter 2005): 3-41.
- “Prayer and Worship,” in Modern Judaism: An Oxford Guide, edited by Nicholas de Lange and Miri Freud-Kandel (Oxford: Oxford University Press, 2005), 231–242.
- “Catholic-Jewish Relations: HUC-JIR Alumni Perspectives,” The Chronicle: Hebrew Union College-Jewish Institute of Religion 64 (2004): 16.
- “Early Rabbinic Liturgy in its Palestinian Milieu: Did Non-Rabbis Know the ‘Amidah?” in When Judaism and Christianity Began: Essays in Memory of Anthony J. Saldarini, ed. Daniel Harrington, Alan J. Avery-Peck, and Jacob Neusner (Leiden and Boston: E. J. Brill, Supplements to Review of Rabbinic Judaism, 2004), pp. 423–439.
- “Jewish Understandings of the Religious Other,” Theological Studies 64 (2003): 255–277.
- “The Amidah as Formative Jewish Prayer,” in Identität durch Gebet: Zur gemeinschaftsbildenden Funktion institutionalisierten Betens in Judentum und Christentum, ed. Albert Gerhards, Andrea Doeker and Peter Ebenbauer (Paderborn: Ferdinand Schöningh, 2003), 127–156.
- “Early Medieval Celebrations of Torah in the Synagogue: A Study of the Rituals of the Seder Rav Amram Gaon and Massekhet Soferim,” [Hebrew: שלבים קדומים בהתפתחותה של הוצאת התורה והכנסתה בבית הכנסת בימי הביניים: עיון בטקסים של סדר רב עמרם גאון ושל מסכת סופרים ] Kenishta: Studies of the Synagogue World 2 (2003): 99-118.
- “Jewish Practices” with Jael B. Paulus, in Volume 3 of The Encyclopedia of Christianity (Wm. B. Eerdmans, Brill, 2003), 45–49.
- “A Jewish Response,” in Sic et Non: Encountering Dominus Iesus, edited by Stephen J. Pope and Charles Hefling (Maryknoll: Orbis Books, 2002), pp. 124–133
