= Harry (given name) =

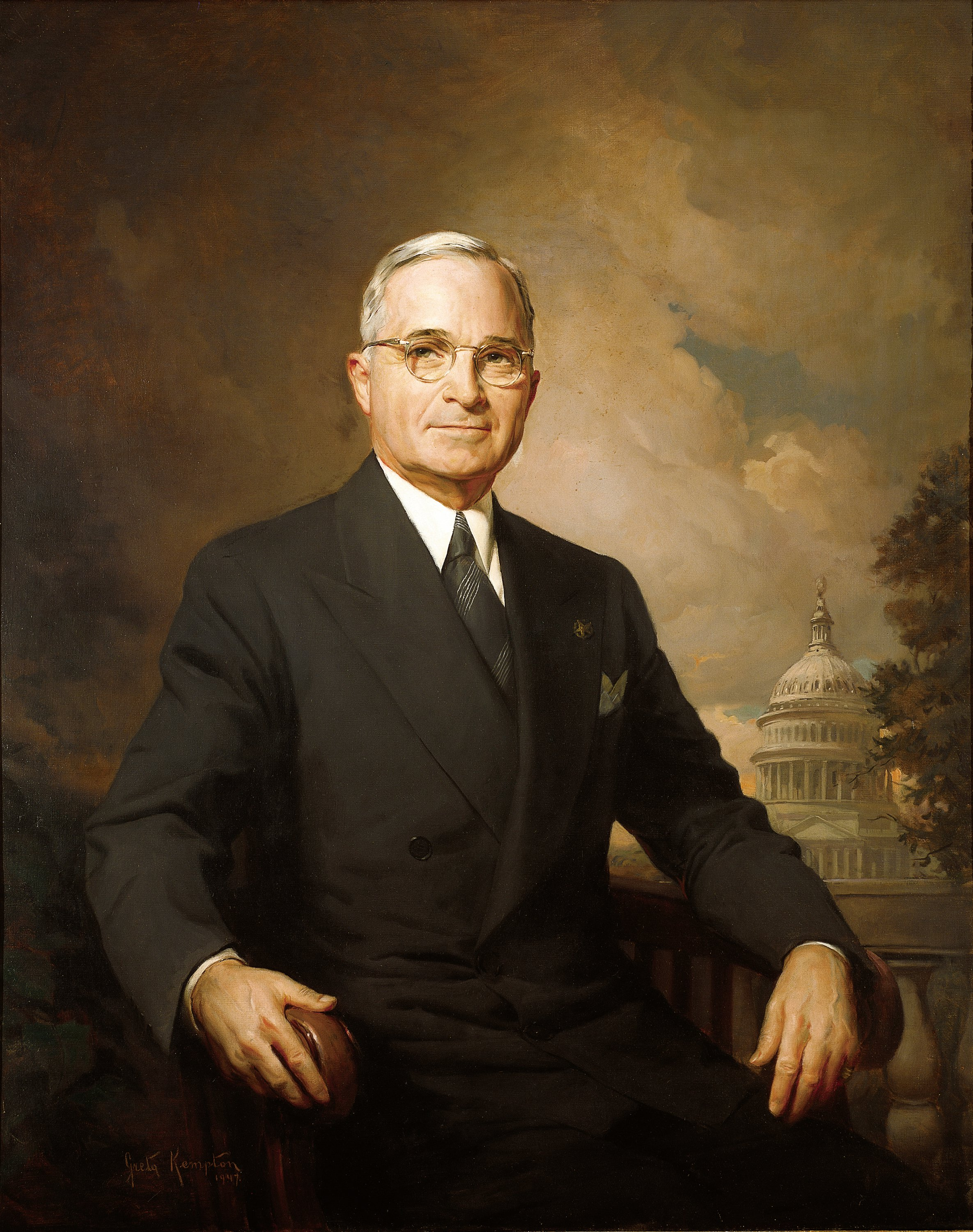
- Harry S. Truman, 33rd President of the United States, official portrait by Greta Kempton, c. 1945
- Pronunciation: /ˈhær.i/
- Gender: Masculine

Origin
- Origin: Medieval English form of Henry (name)
- Meaning: Ruler (Old English), War God (Norse), Army Commander (Old Germanic)

Other names
- Related names: Henry; Hendrick; Hennie; Hendrie; Henrique; Hen; Heinrich; Henderson; Han; Hank; Henk; Hendrik; Harold; Hereweald; Haraldr; Harald; Hagrold; Harvey; Harris; Harrison; Harriet; Harriete; Harolda; Éibhear (Irish); Arioald; Chariovalda; Häräy (Tatar); Gäräy (Tatar); Hari (Hindi); Harri (Finnish/Afrikaans); Heinrich (Old Germanic); Harchibald

Harry is a male given name. Beginning as a Middle English form of Henry, in the modern era it became a diminutive for several names beginning with "Har". The Norwegian term "harry" is derived from the name.

== People ==
=== Single name ===
- Dirty Harry (musician) (born 1982), British rock singer who has also used the stage name Harry
- Prince Harry, Duke of Sussex (born 1984), second son of King Charles III of the United Kingdom

=== Given name ===
- Harry Akst (1894–1963), American songwriter
- Harry Allen (designer) (born 1964), American industrial and interior designer
- Harry Allen (musician) (born 1966), American jazz tenor saxophonist
- Harry Allen (executioner) (1911–1992), British executioner
- Harry Altham (1888–1965), English cricketer
- Harry Anderson (disambiguation), multiple people
- Harry Andersson (1913–1996), Swedish football striker
- Harry Andrews (1911–1989), English film actor
- Harry Angping (born 1952), Filipino politician
- Harry Arter (born 1989), professional footballer
- Harry Atkinson (1831–1892), tenth Premier of New Zealand
- Harry Baals (1886–1954) American mayor of Fort Wayne, Indiana
- Harry Bateman (1882–1946), English mathematician
- Harry Bateman (artist) (1896–1976), English landscape painter
- Harry Baweja (born 1956), Indian film director and producer
- Harry Bass (disambiguation), multiple people
- Harry Beck (1902–1974), English technical draughtsman
- Harry Beck (footballer) (1901–1979), English footballer
- Harry Belafonte (1927–2023), American singer, songwriter, actor and social activist
- Harry L. Billings (1913–1990), American journalist and civil rights advocate
- Harry Birtwistle (born 2003), Singaporean professional footballer
- Harry Blackmun (1908–1999), Associate Justice of the Supreme Court of the United States
- Harry Boland (1887–1922), Irish republican politician
- Harry Bong (1905–1987), Swedish Navy officer
- Harry Boykoff (1922–2001), American basketball player
- Harry Bresslau (1848–1926), German historian and scholar of state papers and of historical and literary muniments
- Harry Brewis (born 1991), English YouTube personality
- Harry Brook (born 1999), English international cricketer
- Harry Browne (1933–2006), American writer, politician, and investment analyst
- Harry E. Burke (1878–1963), American forest entomologist
- Harry Bush (American cricketer) (born 1989), American first-class cricketer
- Harry Bush (English cricketer) (1871–1942), English first-class cricketer
- Harry F Byrd (1887–1966) American Newspaper publisher and politician
- Harry F Byrd, Jr (1914–2013), American orchardist, newspaper publisher and politician
- Harry Callahan (photographer) (1912–1999), American photographer and educator
- Harry Caray (1914–1998), American radio and television sportscaster
- Harry Carey (actor) (1878–1947), American actor
- Harry Carpenter (1925–2010), British BBC sports commentator
- Harry Carpenter (bishop) (1901–1993), English bishop and theologian
- Harry Carpenter (priest), Anglican priest
- Harry Chapin (1942–1981), American folk singer-songwriter and philanthropist
- Harry Choates (1922–1951), American fiddler
- Harry C. Claiborne (1859–1918), American lighthouse keeper
- Harry Clarke (1889–1931), Irish stained-glass artist and book illustrator
- Harry Clarke (footballer, born 2001) (born 2001), English professional footballer
- Harry Cole (journalist) (born 1986), British journalist
- Harry Connick Jr. (born 1967), American singer, pianist, composer, actor, and television host
- Harry Cothliff (1916–1976), English footballer
- Harry Crider (born 1999), American football player
- Harry Corbett (1918–1989), English magician, puppeteer and television presenter
- Harry H. Corbett (1925–1982), English actor and comedian
- Harry Crosbie (fl. 1990's – 2020's), Irish property developer
- Harry Crosby (1898–1929), American heir, World War I veteran, bon vivant, poet, and publisher
- Harry Crosby (businessman) (born 1958), American investment banker and former actor
- Harry Daghlian (1921–1945), American physicist
- Harry Danford (born 1939), Canadian politician
- Harry Danning, American Major League Baseball All-Star catcher
- Harry Davenport (1866–1949), American actor
- Harry Davies-Carr (born 2006?), main subject of viral video Charlie Bit My Finger
- Harry Dias Bandaranaike (1822–1901), first Sinhala and first indigenous Puisne Justice and acting Chief Justice of the Supreme Court of Sri Lanka
- Harry Diddlebock (1854–1900), American sportswriter and Major League Baseball manager
- Harry Edward (1898–1973), British runner
- Harry Eisenstat (1915–2003), Major League Baseball player
- Harry Enfield (born 1961), English comedian, actor, writer and director
- Harry Enten (born 1988), American journalist
- Harry Eriksson (1892–1957), Swedish diplomat
- Harry Feldman (1919–1962), Major League Baseball pitcher
- Harry Wickwire Foster, senior Canadian Army officer who commanded two Canadian divisions during World War II, one of the principal commanders of Aleutian Islands campaign and Operation Cottage
- Harry Fox (1882–1959), American vaudeville dancer, actor and comedian born Arthur Carringford
- Harry Frankfurt (1929–2023), American philosopher
- Harrison Garside (born 1997), Australian boxer
- Harry Geithner (born 1976), Colombian actor, film director and producer
- Harry Gesner (1925–2022), American architect
- Harry Gideonse (1901–1985), American President of Brooklyn College, and Chancellor of the New School for Social Research
- Harry Giles (basketball) (born 1998), American professional basketball player
- Harry Giles (footballer) (1911–1986), Australian rules footballer
- Harry Gilmer (1926–2016), American football halfback and quarterback
- Harry Goodsir (1819–c. 1848), Scottish physician and naturalist
- Harry Goonatilake (1929–2008), 5th Commander of the Sri Lanka Air Force
- Harry Gottsacker (born 1999), American racing driver
- Harry Goularte (born 1956), American racing driver
- Harry Grant (cyclist) (1906–1993), British racing cyclist
- Harry Grant (footballer) (born 1993), English footballer
- Harry Grant (racing driver) (1877–1915), American auto racing driver
- Harry Grant (rugby league) (born 1998), Australian professional rugby league footballer
- Harry Gration (1950–2022), English journalist and broadcaster
- Harry Gregg (1932–2020), Northern Irish professional footballer and manager
- Harry Gregson-Williams (born 1961), British composer, conductor, orchestrator, and record producer
- Harry Grindell Matthews, English inventor who claimed to have invented a death ray in the 1920s
- Harry Groener (born 1951), German-born American actor and dancer
- Harry Guardino (1925–1995), American actor
- Harry Gurney (born 1986), English cricketer
- Harry Gwala (1920–1995), South African African National Congress and Communist Party of South Africa revolutionary
- Harry Gyles (1880–1959), Australian rules footballer
- Harry Haldeman (1926–1993), American politician and businessman
- Harry Harris (boxer) (1880–1959), American world champion bantamweight
- Harry Harrison (writer) (1925–2012), American science fiction author
- Harry Heaney, British chemist
- Harry Hill (born 1964), British comedian – also known as Matthew Keith Hall
- Harry Hollins (1932–1989), American politician
- Harry Houdini (1874–1926), American escapologist and stunt performer born Erik Weisz
- Harry Hughes (disambiguation), multiple people
- Harry Jerome (1940–1982), Canadian track and field sprinter and physical education teacher
- Harry Johansson (1928–2010), Swedish canoeist
- Harry Jowsey (born 1997), Australian television personality
- Harry Kalas (1936–2009), American sportscaster
- Harry Kane (born 1993), English footballer
- Harry Kewell (born 1978), Australian association football coach, manager and former player
- Harry King (cricketer) (1881–1947), English cricketer
- Harry King (footballer) (1886–1968), English footballer
- Harry King (racing driver) (born 2001), English racing driver
- Harry Kinnard, American general officer, one of the principal commanders of Pleiku campaign
- Harry Knowles (born 1971), American film critic and writer
- Harry Krakow (1910–1991), birth name of King Levinsky, American heavyweight boxer
- Harold Walter Kroto, known as Harry Kroto (1939–2016), English chemist
- Harry Landis (1926–2022), British actor and director
- Harry Richard Landis (1899–2008), American First World War veteran
- Harry Langdon (1884–1944), American comedian
- Harry Lauder (1870–1950), Scottish singer and comedian
- Harry Lawtey (born 1996), English actor
- Harry Lennix (born 1964), American actor
- Harry Lewis (boxer) (1886–1956), American world champion welterweight born Harry Besterman
- Harry Litman, American lawyer, law professor and political commentator
- Harry Lloyd (born 1983), English actor
- Harry Lorraine (American actor) (1873–1935), American silent film actor
- Harry Lorraine (English actor) (1885–1970), actor in English silent films
- Harry Lorayne (1926–2023), American magician
- Harry Luff (1856–1916), American Major League Baseball player
- Harry Maguire (born 1993), English footballer
- Harry Manser (1874–1955), justice of the Maine Supreme Judicial Court
- Harry Merrow (born 1938), American politician
- Harry Michael (born 1992), Australian rapper and songwriter, known professionally as Masked Wolf
- Harry Clive Minnett (1917–2003), Australian physicist and radio engineer
- Harry Morgan (1915–2011), American actor
- Harry S. Morgan (1945–2011), German director and producer of pornographic movies
- Harry Mosby (1945–1993), Australian Paralympic athlete from the Torres Strait
- Sir Harry Burrard Neale, British officer of the Royal Navy and Member of Parliament for Lymington
- Harry Ord (1819–1885), British colonial administrator
- Harry Pace (1884–1943), American music publisher and insurance executive
- Harry Partch (1901–1974), American composer, music theorist, and creator of unique musical instruments
- Harry Patch (1898–2009), English supercentenarian, briefly the oldest man in Europe, and the last surviving trench combat soldier of the First World War from any country
- Harry Paulet, British sailor
- Harry Peglar (1812 – c. 1849), English seaman
- Harry Pollitt (1890–1960), British communist politician, former General Secretary of the CPGB
- Harry Prendergast (1834–1913), British general, one of the principal commanders of Third Anglo-Burmese War
- Harry Redknapp (born 1947), English footballer and manager
- Harry Reems (1947–2013), American pornographic film actor
- Harry Reid (1939–2021), American politician
- Harry Roque (born 1966), Filipino lawyer and former law professor
- Harry Sacksioni (born 1950), composer and guitar virtuoso of Dutch origin
- Herschel Saltzman, known as Harry Saltzman (1915–1994), Canadian theatre and film producer
- Harry Scarff (born 1993), English professional boxer
- Harry Secombe (1921–2001), Welsh comedian, actor, singer and television presenter
- Harry Seidler (1923–2006), Austrian-born Australian architect
- Harry Gordon Selfridge (1858–1947), American retail magnate
- Harry Sheezel (born 2004), Australian rules footballer
- Harry Shum (born 1966), Chinese computer scientist
- Harry Shum Jr. (born 1982), Costa Rican-American actor, singer, dancer, and choreographer
- Harry Thomas Silcock (1882–1969), English Quaker missionary
- Harry Smith (disambiguation), multiple people
- Harry Souttar (born 1998), professional footballer
- Harry Stafford (disambiguation), multiple people
- Harry Dean Stanton (1926–2017), American actor, musician, and singer
- H. J. Sterling (Harry John Sterling; 1882–1959), Canadian ice hockey administrator
- Harry F. Stimpson Jr., (Harry Farnum Stimpson Junior, 1913–2005), American lawyer and ambassador
- Harry Styles (born 1994), British singer, songwriter, actor as well as member of the boy band One Direction
- Harry Sugiyama (born 1985), Japanese television personality and model
- Harry Swartz (born 1996), American soccer player
- Harry Taylor (disambiguation), multiple people
- Harry Thurston (born 1950), Canadian writer and journalist
- Harry Alan Towers (1920–2009), British-born radio and independent film producer and screenwriter
- Harry Traver (1877–1961), American roller coaster and amusement ride engineer
- Harry Treadaway (born 1984), English actor
- Harry S. Truman (1884–1972), 33rd President of the United States
- Harry Twite (born 2005), Bermudian footballer
- Harry Vickers (disambiguation), multiple people
- Harry Waalkens (born 1955), New Zealand lawyer
- Harry H. Wachtel (1917–1997), American lawyer
- Harry W. Wachter (1868–1941), American architect
- Harry Spencer Waddington (1780–1864), British politician
- Harry Wade (1928–2016), Canadian basketball player
- Harry Waechter (1871–1929), British businessman and philanthropist
- Harry Wahl (1869–1940), Finnish sailor
- Harry Wahl (politician) (1902–1975), Canadian politician
- Harry Levine Wahlstrand (1890–1962), American politician
- Harry Waibel (born 1946), German historian
- Harry Waidner (1874–1944), American tennis player
- Harry Wainman (born 1943), English footballer
- Harry Wainwright (1864–1925), British railway engineer
- Harry Wainwright (footballer) (born 1899), English footballer
- Harry Wait (1891–1975), English footballer
- Harry Waites (1878–1938), English football coach
- Harry Wake (1901–1981), English footballer
- Harry Mills Walcott (1870–1944), American painter
- Harry Wald (1924–1996), American businessman
- Harry Waldau (1876–1943), German musician and composer
- Harry Walden (1940–2018), English footballer
- Harry Waldock
- Harry Waldow (1887–1969), American artist
- Harry Walker (1918–1999), American baseball player and manager
- Harry Walker (politician) (1873–1950), Australian politician
- Harry Walker (cricketer) (1760–1805), English cricketer
- Harry Walker (rugby union, born 1915) (1915–2018), England international rugby union player
- Harry Walker (footballer) (1916–1976), English footballer
- Harry Walker (rugby union, born 1928) (1928–2008), South African rugby union player
- Harry C. Walker (1873–1932), American politician
- Harry G. Walker (1892–1982), Australian rules footballer
- Harry G. R. Walker (1912–1978), Canadian politician
- Harry Walkerdine (1870–1949), English footballer
- Harry Wall (American football) (1878–1942), American football coach and physician
- Harry Wall (politician) (1894–1955), American politician
- Harry Wallace (politician) (1885–1973), British politician
- Harry Wallace (rugby league) (1882–1917), England international rugby league footballer
- Harry Brookings Wallace (1877–1955), American academic administrator
- Harry Wallbanks (1921–1993), English footballer
- Harry Waller (footballer, born 1917) (1917–1984), English footballer
- Harry Waller (MP) (c. 1701–1772), British lawyer & politician
- Harry Waller (footballer, born 1902) (1902–1982), English footballer
- Harry Walsh (1913–2011), Canadian lawyer
- Harry Walters (Canadian football) (born 1952), American gridiron football player
- Harry Walters (photographer) (1848–1926), English photographer
- Harry Lindley Walters, Canadian politician from Ontario
- Harry N. Walters (1936–2019), American businessman
- Harry Warburton (1921–2005), Swiss bobsledder
- Harry Ward (darts player) (born 1997), English darts player
- Harry Ward (cricketer) (1924–1993), Australian cricketer
- Harry Ward (athlete) (1900–1965), Baseball player
- Harry F. Ward (1873–1966), American Christian socialist leader
- Harry Marshall Ward (1854–1906), British mycologist and plant pathologist
- Harry Wardell (1890–1972), New Zealand pastoralist, businessman, and wool industry leader
- Harry Wardle (1881–1918), English footballer
- Harry Wardman (1872–1938), American real estate developer
- Harry Ware (1911–1970), English footballer
- Harry Waris (1893–1973), Finnish botanist
- Harry Warmby (born 1865), English footballer
- Harry Warnecke (1900–1984), American photographer
- Harry Warner (1881–1958), American studio executive
- Harry Warner Jr. (1922–2003), American writer
- Harry Warner (baseball) (1928–2015), American baseball player and coach
- Harry Waldo Warner (1874–1945), English viola player and composer
- Harry Warren (1893–1981), American composer and lyricist
- Harry Warren (footballer) (c.1903 – 1968), English football manager
- Harry J. Warren (born 1950), American politician
- Harry Marsh Warren (1861–1940), American Baptist minister
- Harry Washington (1740–1800), Slave of George Washington
- Harry Washington (American football) (born 1956), American football player
- Harry Wasylyk (1925–2013), Inventor of the disposable garbage bag
- Harry Lee Waterfield (1911–1988), American politician
- Harry Waters (born 1976), British piano and Hammond organ player
- Harry Waters Jr. (born 1953), American actor and singer
- Harry Watkins (actor) (1825–1894), American actor, playwright and diarist
- Harry Evans Watkins (1898–1963), American judge
- Harry Vaughan Watkins (1875–1945), Wales international rugby union footballer
- Harry Watling (born 1982), English football coach
- Harry Watrous (1857–1940), American artist
- Harry Watson (ice hockey, born 1923) (1923–2002), Canadian ice hockey player
- Harry Watson (ice hockey, born 1898) (1898–1957), Canadian ice hockey player
- Harry Watson (cyclist) (1904–1996), New Zealand cyclist
- Harry Watson (actor) (1921–2001), American actor
- Harry Watson Jr. (1876–1930), American actor and comedian
- Harry Watson (British artist) (1871–1936), English painter
- Harry Watson (footballer, born 1908) (1908–1982), English footballer
- Harry Watson (Australian footballer) (1896–1941), Australian rules footballer
- Harry Watson (New Zealand artist) (1965–2025), New Zealand artist
- Harry Davis Watson (1866–1945), British major-general
- Harry L. Watson (born 1949), American historian
- Harry T. Watson (1882–1957), American athlete and coach
- Harry Watt (1906–1987), Scottish documentary and feature film director
- Harry Watt (politician) (1863–1929), British barrister and Liberal MP
- Harry Watters, American jazz trombonist
- Harry Wattie (1891–1916), Scottish footballer
- Harry Watts (1826–1913), Sunderland sailor and diver
- Harry Watts (jockey) (1894–1940), Canadian thoroughbred horse racing jockey
- Harry Waxman (1912–1984), English cinematographer
- Harry Waya, Malawian former footballer
- Harry Weatherill (1893–1960), Australian rules footballer
- Harry Weaver (1892–1983), American baseball player
- Harry M. Weaver (1909–1977), American neuroscientist
- Harry Webb (politician) (1908–2000), Australian politician
- Harry Webb (communist) (1889–1962), British communist activist
- Harry S. Webb (1892–1959), American film producer
- Harry Webber (1936–2013), South African weightlifter
- Harry Webber (American football) (1892–1970), American football player
- Harry Weber (sculptor) (born 1942), American sculptor
- Harry Weber (baseball) (1862–1926), American baseball player
- George Harry Webster (1868–1933), Canadian politician
- Harry Webster (1917–2007), British automotive engineer
- Harry Webster (footballer, born 1930) (1930–2008), English footballer
- Harry Webster (footballer, born 2006), English footballer
- Harry E. Wedeck (1894–1996), British classical scholar
- Harry Wedge (1957–2012), Australian Aboriginal artist
- Harry Weedon (1887–1970), English architect
- Harry Weese (1915–1998), American modernist architect
- Harry Weetman (1920–1972), English professional golfer
- Harry M. Wegeforth (1882–1941), American physician
- Harry Weidner (1907–1962), Australian rules footballer
- Harry Weinberger (1924–2009), German painter
- Harry Weiss (philatelist) (1888–1966), American philatelist
- Harry Welch (American football) (born 1945), American football coach
- Harry Foster Welch (1893–1973), American actor
- Harry Welchman (1886–1966), Musical theatre and film actor
- Harry Welchonce (1883–1977), American baseball player
- Harry Weld-Forester (born 1981), Scottish cricketer
- Harry Weldon (comedian) (1881–1930), British comedian
- Harry D. Weller, American football, basketball, and baseball coach
- Harry W. Wellford (1924–2021), American judge
- Harry H. Wellington (1926–2011), American scholar and writer
- Harry R. Wellman (1899–1997), American academic
- Harry Malcolm Wellmon (1883–1945), American jazz musician
- Harry Wells (rugby league) (born 1932), Australia international rugby league footballer
- Harry Wells (rugby union) (born 1993), England international rugby union player
- Harry Wells (VC) (1888–1915), recipient of the Victoria Cross
- Harry Gideon Wells (1875–1943), American pathologist
- Harry Weltman (1933–2014), American basketball executive
- Harry Wendelken (born 2001), British tennis player
- Harry Wendelstedt (1938-2012), American baseball umpire
- Harry Wensley (1893–1959), English footballer
- Harry Werksman, American television producer
- Harry West (1917–2004), Northern Ireland politician
- Harry Weston (1928–2008), British basketball player
- Harry J. Weston (1874–1955), Australian artist
- Harry Clay Westover (1894–1983), American judge
- Harry Wetherall (1889–1979), British Army general
- Harry Wetter (1882–1934), Wales international rugby union player
- Harry Wexler (1911–1962), American meteorologist
- Harry F. Weyher Jr. (1921–2002), American lawyer
- Harry Whale (1921–2009), Professor of physics at University of Auckland in New Zealand
- Harry Whalley (born 1984), Northern-Ireland composer based in Scotland
- Harry Whanslaw (1883–1965), British puppeteer
- Harry Wheatcroft (1898–1977), British gardener
- Harry Wheeler (1858–1900), American baseball player
- Harry A. Wheeler (1866–1960), President of the United States Chamber of Comemrce
- Harry C. Wheeler (1875–1925), American lawman
- Harry E. Wheeler (1907–1987), American geologist
- Harry Whelehan (born 1944), Irish barrister and judge
- Harry Whiddon (1878–1935), Australian cricketer
- Harry Frederick Whitchurch (1866–1907), Recipient of the Victoria Cross
- Harry White (Irish republican) (1916–1989), Irish republican paramilitary
- Harry White (jockey) (1944–2022), Australian jockey
- Harry White (Washington politician) (1859–1940), Washington politician
- Harry White (Pennsylvania politician) (1834–1920), American politician
- Harry White (trombonist) (1898–1962), American jazz trombonist
- Harry White (musicologist) (born 1958), Irish musicologist and poet
- Harry White (saxophonist) (born 1967), American saxophonist
- Harry White (footballer, born 1994), English footballer
- Harry White (cricketer, born 1995), English cricketer
- Harry White (cricketer, born 1897) (1897–1978), English cricketer
- Harry White (footballer, born 1901) (1901–1983), English footballer
- Harry White (sailor) (born 2000), British sailor
- Harry Dexter White (1892–1948), American economist and accused spy
- Harry Keith White (born 1946), American politician
- Harry Oliver White (1895–1987), Canadian politician
- Harry Vere White (1853–1941), Irish Anglican bishop
- Harry Whitehead (1874–1944), English cricketer
- Harry Whiteside (1909–1984), Canadian politician
- Harry Whitfield (1908–1988), British motorcycle speedway rider
- Harry Whitney (1873–1936), American sportsman, adventurer, and author
- Harry Payne Whitney (1872–1930), American businessman and horse breeder
- Harry Whitta (1883–1944), New Zealand cricketer
- Harry Whittington (1927–2023), American political figure shot by Dick Cheney
- Harry Whittington (author) (1916–1989), American novelist
- Harry B. Whittington (1916–2020), British palaeontologist
- Harry Whittle (1922–1990), British athlete
- Harry Whitwell (born 2005), English footballer
- Harry Wickham (1882–1962), Solomon Islander swimmer
- Harry Wicks (1905–1989), British socialist activist
- Harry H. Wickwire (1868–1922), Canadian politician
- Harry Elkins Widener (1885–1912), American businessman and bibliophile
- Harry J. Wienbergen (1900–1974), American sports coach, athletics administrator, and educator
- Harry Wiener (1924–1998), American chemist
- Harry Wiggins (1932–2004), American politician
- Harry Wigley (1913–1980), New Zealand businessman
- Harry Wijnschenk (born 1964), Dutch politician
- Harry Wikman (1929–2017), Finnish rower
- Harry Wilcox (1878–1937), English footballer
- Harry J. Wild (1901–1961), American cinematographer
- Harry Emerson Wildes (1890–1982), American writer
- Harry Wilding (1894–1958), English footballer
- Harry Wilf (1921-1992), American businessman
- Harry Wilhelm (American football) (born 1900), American football player and coach
- Harry Wilhelm (1874–1944), American baseball player
- Harry Wilke (1900–1991), American baseball player
- Harry Wilkes (1907–1984), English footballer
- Harry Wilkinson (rugby league) (1909–1971), England international rugby league footballer
- Harry Wilkinson (rugby union) (1903–1988), England international rugby union player
- Harry Wilkinson (rugby) (1864–1942), England international rugby union footballer
- Harry Wilkinson (footballer, born 1883), English footballer
- Harry Wilkinson (footballer, born 1926) (1926–2017), English footballer
- Harry Wilkinson (footballer, born 1903) (1903–1997), English footballer
- Harry Willans (1892–1943), British Army general
- Harry Willcock (1896–1952), British Liberal Party activist (1896-1952)
- Harry Willetts (1922–2005), English scholar and translator
- Harry Williams (soccer, born 1951), Australian Football player
- Harry Williams (songwriter) (1879–1922), American songwriter
- Harry Williams (rugby union) (born 1991), English rugby union player
- Harry Williams (American football) (born 1982), American football player
- Harry Williams (footballer, born 1996), English footballer
- Harry Williams (priest) (1919–2006), Member of Community of the Resurrection (CR)
- Harry Williams (golfer) (1915–1961), Australian amateur golfer
- Harry Williams (footballer, born 1883) (born 1883), English footballer
- Harry Williams (footballer, born 1898) (1898–1980), English footballer
- Harry Williams (first baseman) (1890–1963), American baseball player
- Harry Williams (footballer, born 1875) (born 1875), English footballer
- Harry Williams (footballer, born 1929) (born 1929), English footballer
- Harry Williams (infielder) (1905–1964), American baseball player
- Harry Williams (cricketer) (1903–1967), English cricketer
- Harry Williams (third baseman) (fl. 1920s), American baseball player
- Harry Williams (footballer, born 2002), English association football player
- Harry and Jack Williams, English television writers and producers
- Harry Craven Williams, Welsh Anglican priest
- Harry L. Williams, American educator
- Harry Palmerston Williams (1889–1936), American aviation entrepreneur
- Harry Williamson (athlete) (1913–2000), American middle-distance runner
- Harry Williamson (musician), British musician, producer and inventor
- Harry Albro Williamson (1875–1965), American Freemason
- Harry Willis (entertainer), Australian musician
- Harry Albert Willis (1904–1972), Canadian politician
- Harry Graham Willis (1875–1943), English Southern Africa administrator
- Harry Wills (1889–1958), American boxer
- Harry Willsie, Canadian sports shooter
- Harry Willson (1932–2010), American progressive author
- Harry Wilson (footballer, born 1997), Welsh footballer
- Harry Wilson (halfback) (1902–1990), American football, basketball, and lacrosse player
- Harry Wilson (American football coach), American football coach
- Harry Wilson (hurdler) (1896–1979), New Zealand hurdler
- Harry Wilson (businessman) (born 1971), American businessman
- Harry Wilson (rugby union, born 1999), Australia international rugby union player
- Harry Wilson (actor) (1897–1978), English character actor
- Harry Wilson (rugby league), GB & England international rugby league & union footballer
- Harry Wilson (footballer, born 1953) (born 1953), English footballer
- Harry Wilson (politician) (1869–1948), American politician
- Harry Wilson (Worcestershire cricketer) (1873–1906), English cricketer
- Harry Wilson (Northamptonshire cricketer) (1897–1960), English cricketer
- Harry Wilson (Australian footballer) (1885–1972), Australian rules footballer
- Harry Wilson (Scottish footballer), Scottish footballer
- Harry Wilson (footballer, born 1897), English footballer
- Harry Wilson (footballer, born 1896), Association footballer
- Harry Wilson (rugby union, born 2000), Australian rugby union player
- Harry Wilson (rugby union, born 1997), English rugby union player
- Harry Bristow Wilson (1774–1853), English antiquarian
- Harry L. Wilson (born 1957), American political scientist
- Harry Leon Wilson (1867–1939), American novelist
- Harry Wimperis (1876–1960), British aerospace engineer
- Harry Winberg, Canadian entrepreneur and politician
- Harry Winbush (1903–1990), Australian architect
- Harry Wincott (1867–1947), English songwriter
- Harry Windsor-Fry (1862–1947), British painter and arts educator
- Harry Windsor (surgeon) (1914–1987), Australian cardiac surgeon
- Harry de Windt (1856–1933), British explorer and travel writer
- Harry Winer (born 1947), American film director
- Harry Shindle Wingert (1865–1928), American football and basketball coach
- Harry Wingfield (1910–2002), English illustrator
- Harry Wingham (1895–1969), English footballer
- Harry Winitsky (1898–1939), American socialist
- Harry Winkler (writer), American sitcom writer
- Harry Winkler (handballer) (born 1945), American handball player
- Harry Winks (born 1996), English footballer
- Harry Winokur (1910–2004), American entrepreneur
- Harry Winrow (1916–1973), English cricketer
- Harry Winston (1896–1978), American jeweler
- Harry Winter (1914–2001), German-Austrian singer
- Harry Winter (cricketer) (1857–1921), English cricketer
- Harry A. Winter (1889–1969), Newfoundland politician
- Harry Wismer (1913–1967), American sports broadcaster
- Harry Forbes Witherby (1873–1943), British ornithologist, author, publisher and editor
- Harry Livingston Withers (1864–1902), British educationist and professor
- Harry Withington (1868–1947), English footballer
- Harry Witt (born 1954), German footballer
- Harry Wittig (born 1961), German archer
- Harry Wolf (architect), American architect
- Harry B. Wolf (1880–1944), American politician
- Harry L. Wolf (1908–1993), American cinematographer
- Harry Wolfe (baseball) (1888–1971), American baseball player
- Harry Kirke Wolfe (1858–1918), American psychologist
- Harry Wolff (boxer) (1905–1987), Swedish boxer
- Harry Wolff (booking agent) (born 1890), Booking agent
- Harry Austryn Wolfson (1887–1974), American scholar, philosopher and historian
- Harry Wollaston (1846–1921), Australian public servant
- Harry Wolstenholme (1868–1930), Australian lawyer and ornithologist
- Harry Wolter (1884–1970), American baseball player
- Harry Wolverton (1873–1937), American baseball player
- Harry Womack (1945–1974), American musical artist
- Harry Wong (born 1932), American educator and author
- Harry Hon Hai Wong (1923–2019), Chinese businessman
- Harry Wood (footballer, born 1868) (1868–1951), English footballer
- Harry Wood (aviator) (1894–1959), Canadian flying ace
- Harry Wood (footballer, born 2002) (born 2002), English footballer
- Harry Wood (baseball) (1885–1955), American baseball player
- Harry Wood (athlete) (1902–1975), British athlete
- Harry Blanshard Wood (1882–1924), English recipient of the Victoria Cross
- Harry E. Wood (1926–2009), Judge of the U.S. Court of Federal Claims
- Harry Edwin Wood (1881–1946), British-South African astronomer
- Harry Harvey Wood (1903–1977), Scottish writer
- Harry O. Wood (1879–1958), American seismologist
- Harry G. Woodbury Jr. (1916–1997), US general and engineer
- Harry Woodcock (1928–2003), English footballer
- Harry Hines Woodring (1887–1967), American politician
- Harry Woods (actor) (1889–1968), American actor
- Harry Woods (Australian politician) (born 1947), Australian politician
- Harry Woods (rugby league) (1912–1989), Former GB & England international rugby league footballer
- Harry Woods (Illinois politician) (1863–1914), American politician
- Harry Woods (footballer) (1894–1956), English footballer
- Harry Woods (rugby union) (1903–1972), Australian rugby union player
- Harry M. Woods (1896–1970), American songwriter and pianist
- Harry Woodson (1852–1887), American boxer
- Harry Woodward (naturalist) (fl. 1939), US ranger naturalist
- Harry Woodward (footballer, born 1887) (1887–1918), English footballer
- Harry Woodward (footballer, born 1919) (1919–1984), English footballer
- Harry Page Woodward (1858–1917), British-born Australian geologist, mining engineer and public servant
- Harry Woodyard (Illinois politician) (1930–1997), American politician, businessman, and farmer
- Harry C. Woodyard (1867–1929), American politician
- Harry Ellis Wooldridge (1845–1917), English musical antiquary, artist and Professor of Fine Arts
- Harry Woolf (historian) (1923–2003), American historian
- Harry Woolf, Baron Woolf (born 1933), British life peer and retired barrister and judge
- Harry Bruce Woolfe (1880–1965), English film producer and director
- Harry Woolhouse (1867–1911), English footballer
- Harry Woollcombe (1869–1941), Bishop of Selby & Whitby
- Harry George Woolley (1942–2009), Canadian player, coach, referee, manager, scout and advocate for the game of lacrosse
- Harry Woolman (1909–1996), American stunt performer
- Harry Wootliff, British screenwriter and film director
- Harry Wootton (1896–1964), English footballer
- Harry Worley (born 1988), English footballer
- Harry Hugh Wormald (1879–1955), English plant pathologist and mycologist
- Harry Worrall (1918–1979), English footballer
- Harry Worth (actor, born 1917) (1917–1989), English comedy actor
- Harry Worth (actor, born 1903) (1903–1975), British actor
- Harry Worthington (1891–1990), American long jumper
- Harry Worton (1921–2002), Canadian politician
- Harry Wozniak (born 1964), Barbadian swimmer
- Harry Wragg (1902–1985), British jockey and horse trainer
- Harry Wrathall (1869–1944), English cricketer
- Harry Wright (1835–1895), Baseball player, manager, and developer
- Harry Wright (American football) (1919–1993), American football player and coach
- Harry Wright (Australian footballer) (1870–1950), Australian rules footballer and cricketer
- Harry Wright (footballer, born 1909) (1909–1994), English footballer and manager
- Harry Wright (RAAF officer) (1919–1991), Australian survey draftsman, air force officer, and political activist
- Harry Wright (Queensland politician) (1890–1963), Australian politician
- Harry Wright (footballer, born 1900) (born 1900), English footballer
- Harry Wright (Canadian politician) (1875–1960), Canadian politician
- Harry Wright (footballer, born 1888) (1888–1950), English footballer
- Harry N. Wright (1881–1969), President of City College of New York
- Harry Wrightson (1874–1919), British politician
- Harry Wu (1937–2016), Chinese-American human rights activist
- Harry Wulfsohn (1911–1968), Courland businessman
- Harry Wulze (1887–1923), American film producer
- Harry Wyatt Wunderly (1892–1971), Australian army medical officer
- Harry Wunsch (1910–1954), American football player
- Harry M. Wurzbach (1874–1931), American politician
- Harry Wüstenhagen (1928–1999), German actor
- Harry M. Wyatt III (born 1949), United States Air Force general
- Harry Wyld (1900–1976), English cyclist
- Harry Wyles (1922–1982), English footballer
- Harry Wylie (1878–1951), Canadian sailor
- Harry Wynne (1920–1989), American football player
- Harry Yansaneh (1901–2005), Sierra Leonean journalist
- Harry E. Yarnell (1875–1959), American naval officer
- Harry Yates (footballer, born 1925) (1925–1987), English footballer
- Harry Yates (footballer, born 1861) (1861–1932), English footballer
- Harry Yates (RAF officer) (1896–1968), Canadian pilot and chiropractor
- Harry D. Yates (1903–1996), American banker and politician
- Harry Yeadon (1922–2015), British engineer
- Harry Yeaggy (born 1946), American banker and car collector
- Harry Yee (1918–2022), Hawaiian bartender
- Harry Yeomans (1901–1965), English footballer
- Harry Yerkes (1872–1954), American marimba player
- Harry Yoon, South Korean-born American film editor
- Harry Joe Yorgey (born 1977), American boxer
- Harry York (born 1974), Canadian ice hockey player
- Harry Yorston (1929–1992), Scottish footballer
- Harry Young (American football) (1893–1977), American football, basketball, and baseball player and coach
- Harry Young (rugby league) (born 1899), England international rugby league footballer
- Harry Young (mayor) (fl. 1940s), American politician
- Harry Young (cyclist) (1882–1946), Canadian cyclist
- Harry Young (socialist) (1901–1995), British socialist activist
- Harry Young (musician) (1951–2023), Australian singer and songwriter
- Harry Dove Young (1867–1944), Australian vigneron and politician
- Harry Yount (1839–1924), First game warden in Yellowstone National Park
- Harry Yourell (1919–2011), American politician
- Harry Yoxall (1896–1984), British publisher
- Harry Yven (1912-1988), Norwegian footballer
- Harry Zachariah (1911–2009), Australian cricketer
- Harry Zakour (born 1949), Lebanese-Ghanaian businessman
- Harry Zech (born 1969), Liechtenstein footballer
- Harry Von Zell (1906–1981), American actor, singer, announcer
- Harry Zeller (1918–2004), American basketball player
- Harry Ziegler, German historian
- Harry Zohn (1923–2001), Austrian-American author and translator
- Harry Zolnierczyk (born 1987), Canadian ice hockey player
- Harry Zörnack (born 1939), German handball player

== Fictional characters ==
- Harry Callahan, Clint Eastwood's character in the Dirty Harry film series
- Harry Callahan, in Diane Duane's Young Wizards series
- Harry Coleman, in the 2003 film Freaky Friday
- Harry Blackstone Copperfield Dresden, in the urban fantasy series The Dresden Files
- Sir Harry Paget Flashman, main and eponymous character in the "Flashman" series by George MacDonald Fraser
- Harry Hart, a character in the Kingsman film series
- Harry Leland, a Marvel Comics villain
- Harry Mason, protagonist in the 1999 survival horror video game Silent Hill
- Harry Osborn, a character from Spider-Man
- Sir Harry Pearce, a character in the BBC spy drama Spooks
- Harry Potter, the title character in Harry Potter series by J. K. Rowling
- Harry Solomon, a character on the sitcom 3rd Rock from the Sun
- Harry Sullivan, a companion to Tom Baker's Doctor in the British television series Doctor Who
- Sheriff Harry S. Truman, a character in the American television series Twin Peaks
- Harry Wells, a character from the Arrowverse franchise
- Harry, a main character in Harry & Bunnie

== See also ==
- Harry (disambiguation)
- Harry (surname)
