= Harry Wilson =

Harry Wilson may refer to:

== Sports ==
- Harry Wilson (American football coach), coach at Buchtel College, active 1896
- Harry Wilson (halfback) (1902–1990), American football, basketball, and lacrosse player
- Harry Wilson (hurdler) (1896–1979), New Zealand track and field athlete
- Harry Wilson (Northamptonshire cricketer) (1897–1960)
- Harry Wilson (Worcestershire cricketer) (1873–1906)
- Harry Wilson (rugby league), English rugby league footballer who played in the 1890s and 1900s
- Harry Wilson (rugby union, born 1997), English rugby union player
- Harry Wilson (rugby union, born 1999), Australian international rugby union player
- Harry Wilson (rugby union, born 2000), Australian rugby union player
- Harry Wilson (Australian footballer) (1885–1972), Australian rules footballer with South Melbourne
- Harry Wilson (footballer, born 1896), Irish footballer
- Harry Wilson (footballer, born 1897), English footballer
- Harry Wilson (footballer, born 1953), English footballer
- Harry Wilson (footballer, born 1997), Welsh footballer
- Harry Wilson (Scottish footballer), Scottish footballer (Partick Thistle)

== Others ==
- Harry Wilson (actor) (1897–1978), English-born American character actor
- Harry Wilson (businessman) (born 1971), member of the auto industry task force, former financial executive
- Harry Wilson (politician) (1869–1948), American politician in Louisiana
- Harry Bristow Wilson (1774–1853), English antiquarian
- Harry L. Wilson (born 1957), professor of political science at Roanoke College
- Harry Leon Wilson (1867–1939), American novelist and dramatist
- H. Neill Wilson (1855–1927), architect

== See also ==
- Harold Wilson (disambiguation)
- Henry Wilson (disambiguation)
- Harrison Wilson, 90210 character
- Harry Willson (1932–2010), American writer
