= Zakour =

Zakour is a surname. Notable people with the surname include:

- Abbas Zakour (born 1965), Israeli politician
- Abdellah Zakour (1885–1972), Moroccan Berber military leader
- Eli Zakour, Trinidad and Tobago politician
- Harry Zakour, Lebanese-born Ghanaian businessman and football administrator
- John Zakour (born 1957), American writer
