= Senator Wall =

Senator Wall may refer to:

== Members of the United States Senate ==
- Garret D. Wall (1783–1850), U.S. Senator from New Jersey from 1835 to 1841
- James Walter Wall (1820–1872), U.S. Senator from New Jersey in 1863

== United States state senate members ==
- Hampton W. Wall (1831–1898), Illinois State Senate
- Harry Wall (politician) (1894–1955), Washington State Senate
- Jamie Wall (politician) (born 1971), Wisconsin State Senate
- Thomas Wall (politician) (1840–1896), Wisconsin State Senate

== See also ==
- Josiah T. Walls (1842–1905), Florida State Senate
