= Harry Walters =

Harry Walters may refer to:

- Harry N. Walters, American businessman, administrator of US Army affairs in the Reagan administration
- Harry Walters (photographer), Ipswich, England
- Harry Walters (Canadian football), Canadian football player
- Harry Lindley Walters, Canadian politician
