= Henry Wilson (disambiguation) =

Henry Wilson (1812–1875) was the 18th vice president of the United States and a U.S. senator from Massachusetts.

Henry Wilson may also refer to:

== Other politicians ==
- Henry Wilson (Pennsylvania politician) (1778–1826), United States congressman
- Henry Wilson (Suffolk politician) (1797–1866), MP for West Suffolk
- Henry Wilson (Holmfirth MP) (1833–1914), MP for Holmfirth
- Henry Lumpkin Wilson (1839–1917), Atlanta physician and city councilman
- Henry Lane Wilson (1857–1932), U.S. ambassador to Mexico
- Sir Henry Wilson, 1st Baronet (1864–1922), British Army officer and MP assassinated by the IRA
- Henry Wilson, Baron Wilson of Langside (1916–1997), Scottish lawyer, Labour politician and life peer

== Military ==
- Henry J. Wilson (U.S. Army officer) (1793–1872)
- Henry Wilson (British Army officer, born 1859) (1859–1941), World War I British general
- Henry Braid Wilson (1861–1954), U.S. Navy admiral
- Sir Henry Wilson, 1st Baronet (1864–1922), World War I British general
- Henry Maitland Wilson (1881–1964), World War II British general

== Religion ==
- Henry Bristow Wilson (1803–1888), theologian and fellow of St John's College, Oxford
- Henry Wilson (bishop) (1876–1961), bishop of Chelmsford and author
- Henry Wilson, 10th Baron Berners (1762–1851), English reverend and peer

== Sports ==
- Henry Wilson (cricketer) (1865–1914), Australian cricketer
- Henry Wilson (rugby union) (1869–1945), New Zealand rugby union player and cricketer
- Henry Wilson (baseball) (1876–?), American baseball player
- Henry Wilson (basketball) (born 1960s), American basketball player

== Others ==
- Henry Wilson (sailor) (1740–1810), captain of the Antelope and first European visitor to Palau
- Henry Schütz Wilson (1824–1902), English writer
- Henry Van Peters Wilson (1863–1939), biology professor
- Henry Wilson (architect) (1864–1934), British architect, jeweller, and designer
- Henry J. Wilson (farmer) (1904–1985), English farmer and military officer
- Henry Wilson, 11th Baron Berners (1797–1871), English peer and agriculturalist

== Other uses ==
- USS Henry B. Wilson, a guided missile armed destroyer

== See also ==
- Hack Wilson (1900–1948), Major League Baseball player
- Hank Wilson (1947–2008), LGBT and AIDS activist
- Harry Wilson (disambiguation)
- Henry Willson (1911–1978), Hollywood agent
- Henry Wilson-Fox (1863–1921), English lawyer, journalist, tennis player, and businessman
