= Harry Waller =

Harry or Henry Waller may refer to:

- Harry Waller (footballer, born 1917) (1917–1984), English footballer
- Harry Waller (footballer, born 1902) (1902–1982), English footballer
- Harry Waller (MP)
- Henry Waller (c. 1587–1631), MP for City of London
