= Harry White (sailor) =

British sailor

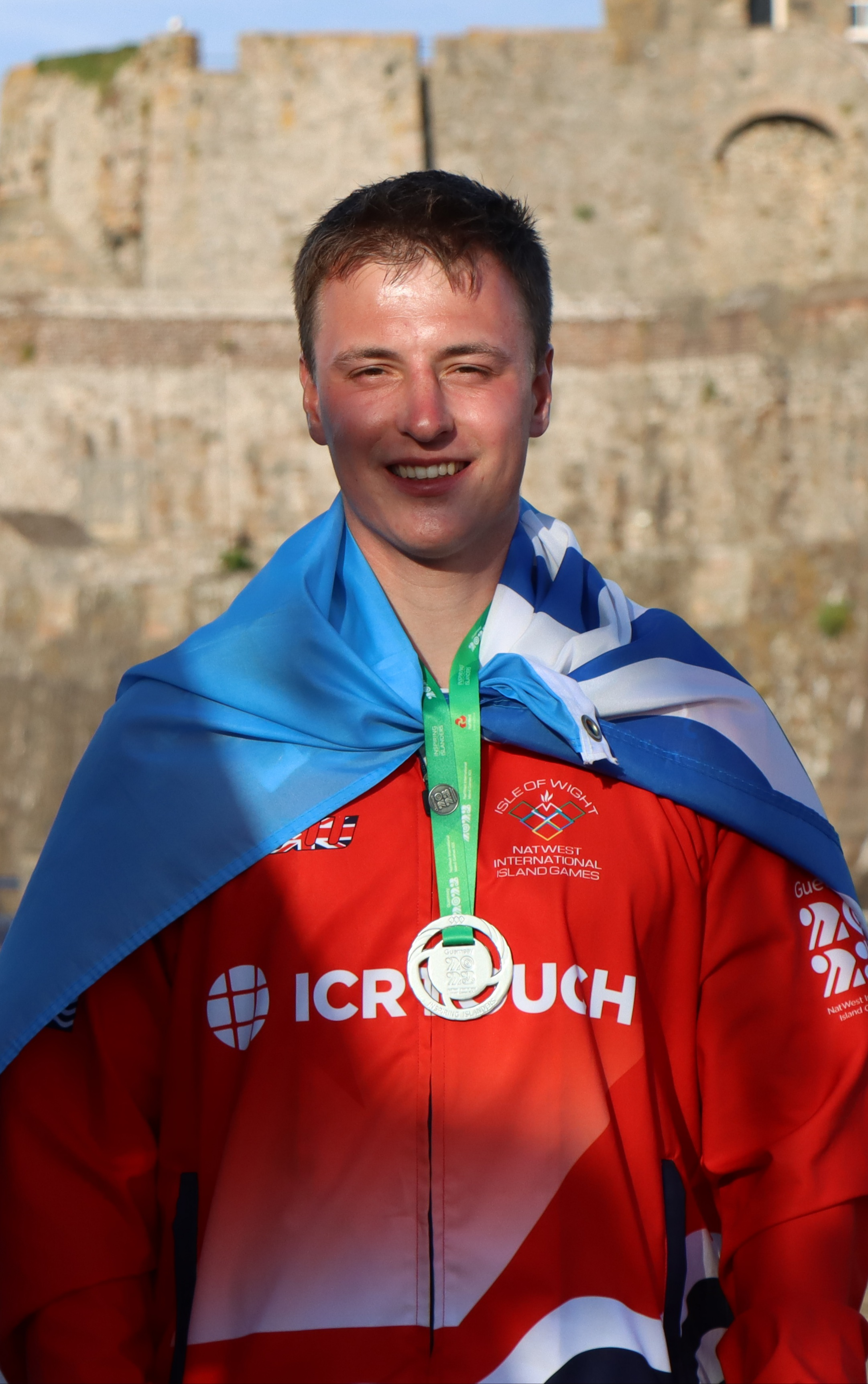

Personal information
- Nationality: British
- Born: 27 February 2000 (age 26)
- Height: 177 cm (5 ft 9 1/2 in)
- Weight: 73 kg (161 lb; 11 st 7 lb)
- Website: WhiteBrothersRacing.co.uk

Sport
- Country: United Kingdom
- Sport: Sailing
- Event: British Young Sailor of the Year
- Club: Royal Victoria Yacht Club
Medal record
Harry White
Medal record
International Island Games
Silver medal – second place	2023 Guernsey	Team event ILCA
Eight Metre World Cup 2024
Gold medal – first place	2024 Clyde	First Rule Class
International Island Games
Gold medal – first place	2025 Orkney	Team event ILCA
International Island Games
Bronze medal – third place	2025 Orkney	Individual event ILCA 7
Squib Nationals
Gold medal – first place	2023 Weymouth	Youth
Squib Inland Championships
Gold medal – first place	2016 Rutland	Bronze Fleet

Harry White (born 27 February 2000) is a British competitive sailor. His greatest success came after being named British Young Sailor of the Year 2022, along with his brothers Charlie and Thomas, for winning both the Musto Young Skipper and Under 25 Team Trophies at Cowes Week in 2022, racing their squib Kestrel (835).

He also held the world record for the greatest distance sailed in a single-handed dinghy in 12 hours in 2021, completing 107.64 km (66.9 miles) sailed on The Solent. In the fall of 2023, the record was broken by Thomas McEvoy from Mooloolaba, Australia as he sailed 125.60 km on 17 May.

In 2025, he led Team Isle of Wight at the International Island Games in Orkney, to a historic victory as the team dominated the sailing events, taking home team gold, while White also claimed an individual bronze medal in the ILCA 7 fleet. They set a new record for the lowest ever combined team score at the games and topped the Isle of Wight medal table with their record performance.

== Early life ==
Harry White was born in the London Borough of Camden as the youngest sibling after his brothers Thomas and Charlie. They were brought up on the Isle of Wight, attending various public island schools throughout their education.

White joined the local Royal Victoria Yacht Club in 2008, where he started his official sailing journey at the age of eight.

In 2021, he graduated from the University of Portsmouth in Geography BSc, achieving First Class Honors.

== Early years of sailing ==
After joining the Royal Victoria Yacht Club (RVYC), White began training in the Optimist, where he progressed his basic skills learning the fundamentals of sailing, and later racing.

His progress was swift, as he started racing just two years later in 2010, entering at club level. In the following years he proceeded to race at the national level, but only placed as high as 11th out of 78 in the South Coast Championships in 2011, hosted at the Royal Lymington Yacht Club. Later that year, he joined sailors from the RVYC and Brading Haven Yacht Club (to represent Team Isle of Wight) in Southampton to challenge for the RYA OnBoard Title Champion of Champions event, where they won, beating Team Hampshire. While in the Optimist, he found great success at the local level, claiming many local regatta and club titles, but it was not until his progression to the ILCA, formally known as the Laser, that he would prove his ability.

In 2015, he stepped into the Laser, winning the South Coast Championships in the smaller 4.7 rig (known today as the ILCA 4). Similarly to his Optimist, he continued to achieve local titles at club and regatta level. 2018 and 2019 saw him compete at multiple UK World and European qualifier events, though a string of bad luck with broken masts and kit malfunctions prevented any further progress in the ILCA class until later years.

The RVYC boasted a competitive double-handed keelboat fleet, in the National Squib class. Keen members of the club provided White and his brothers with the opportunity to sail in the class starting in 2014 and develop on a different type of sailing compared to dinghies. With practice and the generosity of the National Squib class, White and his brothers were able to compete at events including the prestigious Cowes Week, Nationals, Inlands and South Coast Championship.

== Island Games ==
=== Gibraltar 2019 & Guernsey 2023 ===
After his junior progression in the Optimist and Laser, White set his sights on competing at the Island Games, which is a biennial multi-sport event consisting of competitors from 24 islands or island groups around the world. He was selected to represent Team Isle of Wight at the 2019 Island Games in the Laser Radial (ILCA 6). Team Isle of Wight finished 7th in the team standings, and White ended the regatta in 10th individually.

Due to the COVID-19 pandemic, the Guernsey Island Games were postponed until 2023. In this time, White moved from the ILCA 6 to the ILCA 7 rig. Once again he was selected to represent Team Isle of Wight. This time round saw the Isle of Wight sailors net consistent results across both fleets, securing team silver medals. Individually, he placed 6th in the ILCA 7 individual rankings. This marked the first Isle of Wight sailing team medal since the 2015 Island Games in Jersey, which previously saw Team Isle of Wight take silver.

Event	Gold		Silver		Bronze	
ILCA 6 (Laser Radial)	Borja Torres Florit; Menorca	21	Dominic Breen-Turner; Ynys Môn	25	Nicole Stovell; Bermuda	35
ILCA 7 (Laser Standard)	Andrew Bridgman; Guernsey	20	Per Sahlberg; Åland	21	James Tilley; Jersey	30
Team event	Åland Islands; Thomas Lindström; Per Sahlberg; Johan Sundblom; Erik Wahlsten	142	Isle of Wight; Alex Downer; Noah Evans; Charlie White; Harry White	157	Ynys Môn; Dominic Breen-Turner; Josh Metcalfe; Ryan Seddon; Michael Thorne	175

=== Orkney 2025 ===
The 2025 International Island Games were hosted in Orkney, where around 2,500 athletes from across 24 islands competed in 12 different sports. White competed in his third Games and his second time in the ILCA 7 fleet. He raced alongside island teammate Arthur Farley, a highly decorated and talented young sailor in the British Sailing Team. After the disappointment of finishing 6th in the individual standings in Guernsey, he focused on strong wind sailing performance. After 10 races were completed, the pair of Farley and White combined won every single race. Farley won the individual gold medal (9 pts), and White secured the bronze medal (38 pts) on countback over the Welsh sailor, Alistair Dickson.

As a team, they collected four medals: three gold and one bronze (ILCA 6 gold, ILCA 7 gold, team gold & ILCA 7 bronze). This performance saw the sailing team top the overall Isle of Wight medal table for the first time.

* Host nation (Orkney)

2025 Island Games medals
Rank	Nation	Gold	Silver	Bronze	Total
1	Isle of Wight (IOW)	3	0	1	4
2	Ynys Môn	0	2	0	2
3	Menorca	0	1	0	1
4	Cayman Islands (CAY)	0	0	1	1
4	Guernsey (GUE)	0	0	1	1
Totals (5 entries)		3	3	3	9

Event	Gold		Silver		Bronze	
ILCA 7	Arthur Farley; Isle of Wight	9	Josh Metcalfe; Ynys Môn	32	Harry White; Isle of Wight	38
ILCA 6	Oliver Mayo; Isle of Wight	12	Ines Maria Abreu Garcia; Menorca	33.5	Nicole Stovell; Cayman Islands	44
Team event	Isle of Wight; Arthur Farley; Oliver Mayo; Oliver Smith; Harry White	62	Ynys Môn; Alistair Dickson; Catherine Elson; Josh Metcalfe; Benjamin Todd	146	Guernsey; David Aslett; Monty Desforges; Darragh Lee; Jessica Watson	178

== Sailing achievements ==
The time after the COVID-19 pandemic proved to be a turning point for White as he gained better and more consistent results at various sailing regattas and events in addition to breaking a Guinness World Record.

=== World record ===
On 7 September 2021, White set sail from the RVYC with the goal of breaking the world record for the greatest distance sailed in a single-handed dinghy in 12 hours. The Solent proved to be a reliable stretch of water to attempt such a challenge. With the assistance of a safety rib, he was able to beat the record, setting the new mark at 107.64 km. In the fall of 2023, the record was broken by Thomas McEvoy from Mooloolaba, Australia as he sailed 125.60 km on 17 May. White has stated that he would be eager to attempt reclaiming his record.

=== Cowes Week & British Young Sailors of the Year ===
Cowes Week has proved to be a regatta where White and his brothers Thomas and Charlie have shone in the National Squib class. They first competed in Cowes Week and Cowes Classics Week in 2015 using an RVYC owned Squib, Alice (777). Over the seasons, White and his brothers improved on their setup and competitiveness. After taking ownership of their Squib, Kestrel (835), the brothers proceeded to compete at the front of the fleet, assisted by their in-depth knowledge of the local Solent area. In 2022, they became the first team to win both the Musto Young Skippers Trophy and the Under 25 Team Trophy. This achievement led them to be nominated and subsequently crowned British Young Sailors of the Year 2022 at the Royal Thames Yacht Club in Knightsbridge. This was the first time any set of triplets had won such a prestigious award in British sailing history.

Following on from his success at Cowes Week in 2022, White and his brothers raced in defence of their titles. A windy regatta in 2023 led to a number of on-the-water incidents across the fleets. After a week of intense Solent racing, they became the first team in history to successfully defend the Under 25 Team Trophy sponsored by Montgomery Estate Planning. They lost their defence of the Musto Young Skippers Trophy by only 1.55 points to Palaver and finished 3rd in the Squib Class overall for a second year running. White and his brothers remain the most successful youth team to have ever competed in Cowes Week.

=== Other significant achievements ===
- 1st 2011 RYA OnBoard Festival in Cowes, Isle of Wight
- 1st 2011 RYA OnBoard Champion of Champions in Southampton, UK
- 1st 2015 Laser South Coast Championships on the Solent, UK
- 1st 2016 Squib Inlands Bronze Fleet Rutland, UK
- 1st 2016 Squib Inlands Best Newcomer Rutland, UK
- 2nd 2016 Laser Match Racing at RSYC
- 8th 2018 RORC Cherbourg Race from Cowes to Cherbourg
- 10th 2019 International Island Games ILCA 6 Individual in Gibraltar
- 7th 2019 International Island Games Team Event in Gibraltar
- 1st 2021 Cowes Week Squib Class in Cowes, Isle of Wight
- 1st 2021 Evening Class 1 Season at ISC
- 1st 2022 Mermaid Gin Regatta at BHYC
- 3rd 2022 X-Yacht Solent Cup at RSYC
- 1st 2022 Icebreaker Series Fast Division at BHYC
- 1st 2022 Spring Class 1 at ECSC
- 1st 2022 Platinum Jubilee Regatta at the RVYC
- 1st 2022 Evening Class 1 Season at ISC
- 1st 2022 Autumn Series Fast Division at the RVYC
- 3rd 2022 Cowes Week Squib Class in Cowes, Isle of Wight
- 1st 2022 Cowes Week Under 25 Team Trophy in Cowes, Isle of Wight
- 1st 2022 Cowes Week Musto Young Skipper Trophy in Cowes, Isle of Wight
- 2nd 2023 Frostbite Series Fast Division at the RVYC
- 1st 2023 Commissioning Cup at the RVYC
- 2nd 2023 Creek Race at the RVYC
- 1st 2023 Autumn Series Fast Division at the RVYC
- 3rd 2023 Icebreaker Series Fast Division at BHYC
- 1st 2023 Mermaid Gin Regatta at BHYC
- 1st 2023 Mermaid Match Racing at SVYC
- 1st 2023 Evening Class 1 Season at ISC
- 1st 2023 Spring Class 1 at ECSC
- 3rd 2023 Mid Summer Class 1 at ECSC
- 1st 2023 Late Summer Class 1 at ECSC
- 1st 2023 Season Overall Class 1 at ECSC
- 3rd 2023 Carr Cup Seaview Village Regatta at SVYC
- 1st 2023 Sommers Trophy Pursuit Race at SVYC
- 1st 2023 Mermaid Team Racing at SVYC
- 1st 2023 Seaview Squib Regatta at SVYC
- 1st 2023 Bembridge Squib Regatta at BSC
- 4th 2023 ISC Round the Island Race Division 5B
- 1st 2023 Under 25 Squib Nationals at WSC
- 3rd 2023 Cowes Week Squib Class in Cowes, Isle of Wight
- 1st 2023 Cowes Week Under 25 Team Trophy in Cowes, Isle of Wight
- 3rd 2023 Cowes Week Musto Young Skipper Trophy in Cowes, Isle of Wight
- 2nd 2023 International Island Games Sailing Team Event in Guernsey
- 6th 2023 International Island Games Sailing Individual Event in Guernsey
- 4th 2024 Seaview Yacht Club ILCA GP
- 1st 2024 Eight Metre World Cup - First Rule Class
- 1st 2024 Brading Haven Yacht Club Icebreaker Series
- 1st 2024 ISC Evening Series Class 1
- 1st 2024 Seaview Yacht Club Midweek Mermaids
- 2nd 2024 Bembridge Sailing Club Regatta
- 1st 2024 Richard Mille Cup Cowes Stage
- 1st 2025 SVYC ILCA Pursuit Race
- 5th 2025 Squib South Coast Championships
- 1st 2025 SVYC Squib Regatta
- 1st 2025 Bembridge Sailing Club Squib Regatta
- 1st 2025 ISC Evening Series Class 1
- 1st 2025 SVYC Midweek Mermaid Series
- 1st 2025 RVYC Autumn Series Squib Class
- 1st 2025 RVYC Bank Holiday Series Squib Class
- 1st 2025 RVYC Late Summer Series Squib Class
- 1st 2025 RVYC Commissioning Cup
- 5th 2025 ISC Class 5A Round the Island Race
- 33rd 2025 RORC Class 4 Fastnet Race
- 5th 2025 JOG Weymouth Race
- 3rd 2025 Orkney Island Games ILCA 7 Class
- 1st 2025 Orkney Island Games Sailing Team Event
