= Harry Bass =

Harry Bass may refer to:

- Harry Bass, one half of the British DJ duo Third Party
- Harry Bass (cricketer) (1852–1904), English groundsman and cricketer
- Harry Brinkley Bass (1916–1944), American military pilot
- Harry W. Bass Sr. (1895–1970), American oilman and philanthropist
- Harry W. Bass Jr. (1927–1998), American oilman, coin collector and philanthropist
- Harry W. Bass (Pennsylvania politician) (1866–1917), American politician
