= Harry (derogatory term) =

Norwegian derogatory term used in slang

Harry is a Norwegian derogatory term used in slang, derived from the English name Harry. The best English translation may be "tacky". Norsk ordbok defines "harry" as "tasteless, vulgar".

The term "harry" was first used by upper class youth in Oslo in the beginning of the 20th century and was used to describe people who belonged to the working class. People in the lower social classes at the time often gave their children English first names such as Harry. The middle and upper classes mostly preferred Scandinavian or German (and occasionally French) names. English names (except English names that are also widely found in other European languages) had no tradition in Scandinavia and were generally considered bad taste and as a phenomenon of the working-class of the time in all the Scandinavian countries. The traditional elite of Norway mostly used conservative Danish names.

A person who is harry is often perceived as unsophisticated, vulgar or with bad taste. The effect of bad taste is often characterized with the term harry, e.g. a harry dress or a harry car. Since the definition of good and bad taste is defined by fashion, there is no precise definition of harry. D.D.E., Sputnik, shopping in Sweden, Raggare culture and mullets are often mentioned today. In the 1970s, it was the 1960s hairwax or sharp shoes that were harry. In the 1980s, the 1970s flared pants or whiskers and in the 1990s, more or less everything that could be associated with the 1980s. Yesterday's fashion will often be interpreted as harry. Often what is harry in one period can be hip retro fashion the next year.

Harry may also be interpreted as something like macho. The feminine parallel is doris.

The term was repopularised by then Minister of Agriculture Lars Sponheim in 2002 to describe Norwegians who drive (in some cases, for hours) to reach and cross the border to Sweden in order to purchase groceries, tobacco, and alcohol at cheaper prices. Responses to this were retorts that seeking out bargains is smart shopping and Swedish shops introduced humorous campaigns with one shopkeeper giving 1000 SEK to customers named "Harry". The terms Harrytur ("Harry trip") or Harryhandel ("Harry trade") have since been popular descriptions of this trade.

== See also ==
- Bogan, Australian term
- Kevinismus, comparable trend in Germany

== Literature ==
- Kalvø, Are: Harry. Det Norske Samlaget. ISBN 82-521-5419-0
