= Harold Wilson (disambiguation) =

Harold Wilson (1916–1995) was Prime Minister of the United Kingdom from 1964 to 1970 and from 1974 to 1976.

Harold Wilson may also refer to:

- Harold A. Wilson (athlete) (1885–1916), British track Olympian, 1500 m silver medalist in 1908
- Harold E. Wilson (1921–1998), U.S. Marine, Medal of Honor recipient
- Harold Wilson (cricketer), New Zealand cricketer
- Hobb Wilson (1904–1977, Harold Wilson), Canadian ice hockey player
- Harold Wilson (rower) (1903–1981), American rower
- Harold A. Wilson (physicist) (1874–1964), English physicist
- Hal Wilson (1861–1933), character actor in silent films
- SS Harold O. Wilson, a Liberty ship

== See also ==
- Harry Wilson (disambiguation)
- Wilson (surname)
