= Abdellah Zakour =

Moroccan Berber military leader

Amghar Abdellah Zakour
- ⵄⴱⴷⵍⵍⴰⵀ ⵣⴰⴽⵓⵔ عبد الله زاكور
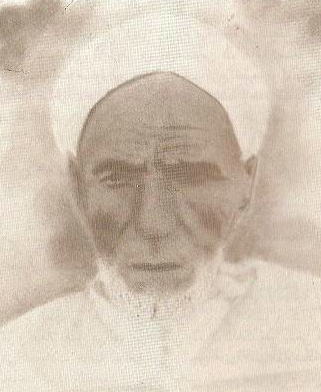
- Born: 1885; Ait Abdallah, Morocco
- Died: 1972 (aged 86–87)
- Military career
- Conflicts: Ait Abdellah

Abdellah Zakour (in Tachelhit: ⵄⴱⴷⵍⵍⴰⵀ ⵣⴰⴳⵓⵔ), also known as "Amghar Gou Ablla" (Ait Abdallah, 1885 - 1972) was a Moroccan Berber military leader who opposed the French conquest of Morocco in the early 20th century.

Zakour is notable for leading the battle of Ait Abdallah in 1934, which was one the last battles (if not the last) in the Moroccan resistance to the French army, and marking the end of the so-called "pacification of Morocco". After their surrender following the battle, Zakour was remembered for saying that "no more bullets, no more words" (meaning that there's nothing left to say).

== Battle of Ait Aballah ==
The battle of Ait Abdellah took place in 1934, in the commune with the same name, in Taroudant region, in the Anti-Atlas mountains of Morocco. It opposed resistance fighters led by Abdellah Zakour, to French forces. The battle lasted for 3 days where the French army used 18 warplanes and shelling to undermine the locals, who surrendered after running out of ammunition.

== Coverage ==
A book and a film were issued in order to commemorate Abdellah Zakour and the battle of Ait Abdallah:

- In 2021, the High Commissioner for Former Resistants and Former Members of the Liberation Army in Morocco has released a 257-page book entitled "The Battle of Ait Abdallah against the French Colonization.".
- The film "Words of Lead" (2020) by Ahmed Baidou relating the story of the Battle.

== See also ==
- Ali Amhaouch
- Mhand n'Ifrutant
- Mouha ou Hammou Zayani
