= Harry Williams (cricketer) =

English cricketer

Harry Williams was an English cricketer active from 1923 to 1931 who played for Northamptonshire (Northants). He was born in Highgate, Middlesex on 30 October 1903 and died in Koping, Sweden on 2 June 1989. He appeared in seven first-class matches scoring 104 runs with a highest score of 27. He took five wickets with a best performance of two for 29.
