= Harry Withington =

English footballer

Personal information
- Full name: Sidney Harry Withington
- Date of birth: q2 1868
- Place of birth: Cannock, England
- Date of death: 1947 (aged 78–79)
- Position: Full back

Senior career*
Years	Team	Apps	(Gls)
188?–1890	Darlington		
1890–1893	Walsall Town Swifts (Note: Appearances are for matches in the Football League only.)	20	(0)
1893–1???	Cannock Town		
- * Club domestic league appearances and goals

Sidney Harry Withington (q2 1868 – 1947) was an English footballer who played as a full back in the Football League for Walsall Town Swifts.

Withington played for Darlington in the 1889–90 FA Cup, and was a member of the team that played the club's first match in league competition, a 2–1 defeat away to Newcastle East End on 7 September 1889, the opening day of the inaugural season of the Northern League. He joined Football Alliance club Walsall Town Swifts in 1890, and two years later played in their first match in the Football League, a 2–1 defeat at home to Darwen on the opening day of the first season of the Football League Second Division. He made 20 league appearances that season, and then left to play non-league football for Cannock Town, where he remained until at least the 1896–97 season.
