= Harry Witt =

German footballer

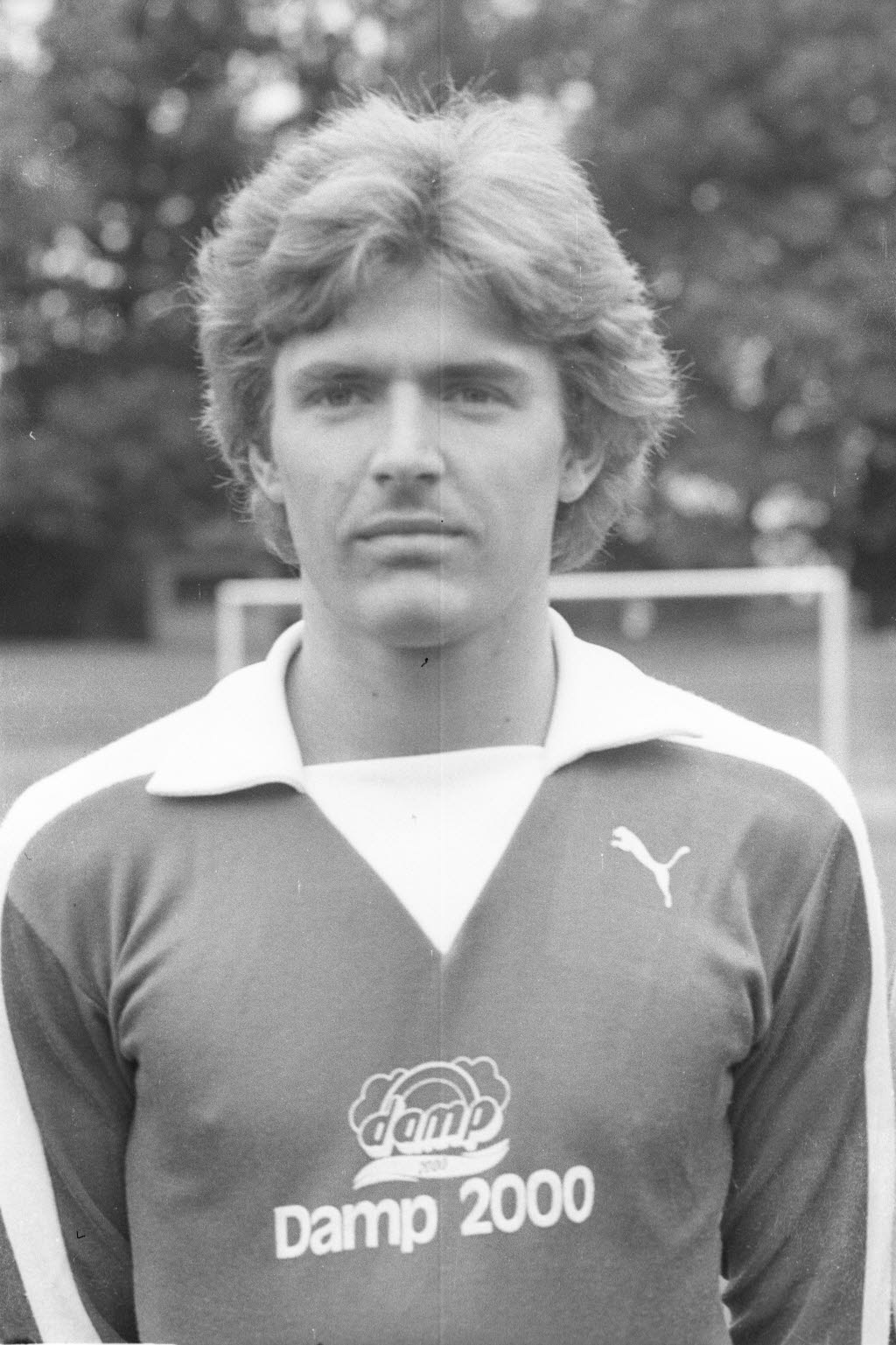
- Witt with Holstein Kiel during the 1978–79 season

Personal information
- Date of birth: 29 August 1954
- Position: Forward

Senior career*
Years	Team	Apps	(Gls)
1973–1980	Holstein Kiel		
1980–1981	SC Viktoria Köln	15	(1)
1981–1982	SG Union Solingen	10	(5)
1983–1987	Holstein Kiel		
1987–1988	SV Ellerbek		

Managerial career
- SC Comet Kiel
- TSV Altenholz
- 1995: Holstein Kiel
- 2002–2015: TSV Altenholz
- 2015–2017: Inter Türkspor Kiel
- 2018: Inter Türkspor Kiel
- * Club domestic league appearances and goals

Harry Witt (born 29 August 1954) is a German former professional football player, who played as a forward, and later manager. He is currently the sports director for FC Kilia Kiel, which plays in the Schleswig-Holstein-Liga.
