= Harry Wait =

English footballer (1891–1975)

Personal information
- Full name: Harry Wait
- Date of birth: 25 November 1891
- Place of birth: Pleck, England
- Date of death: 1975 (aged 83–84)
- Position: Goalkeeper

Senior career*
Years	Team	Apps	(Gls)
1908–1923	Darlaston		
1923–1936	Walsall	264	(0)
Total		264	(0)
- * Club domestic league appearances and goals

Harry Wait (25 November 1891 – 1975) was an English footballer who played in the Football League for Walsall.
