= Harry Allen (designer) =

American designer

Harry Allen (born 1964) is an American industrial and interior designer. Originally from New Jersey, Allen attended Alfred University and later Pratt Institute, where he received a master's degree in Industrial Design. In 1993, he founded Harry Allen Design, located in New York City’s East Village.

== Designs ==
Allen has designed furniture, lighting, products, and interiors for a variety of international clients. Notable designs include the interior of the design store Moss; the Reality line for Areaware, including the Bank in the Form of a Pig; and the bottle for Marc Jacobs' Bang perfume.

== Collections and awards ==
His work is in the permanent collection of the Museum of Modern Art, the Brooklyn Museum of Art, and the Philadelphia Museum of Art. His awards include two Industrial Design Society of America IDEA Awards and the Brooklyn Museum of Art’s Modernism/Young Designer Award.
