= Harry G. Walker =

Australian rules footballer

Harry Walker

Personal information
- Full name: Henry George Walker
- Born: 7 August 1892; Hawthorn, Victoria
- Died: 24 November 1982 (aged 90); Malvern, Victoria
- Original team: Kew Juniors

Playing career^{1}
Years	Club	Games (Goals)
1912–13	Richmond	9 (5)
- ^{1} Playing statistics correct to the end of 1913.

Henry George Walker (7 August 1892 – 24 November 1982) was an Australian rules footballer who played with Richmond in the Victorian Football League (VFL).
