= Harry King (cricketer) =

English cricketer

Personal information
- Full name: Harry King
- Born: 6 November 1881; Leicester, Leicestershire, England
- Died: 30 June 1947 (aged 65); South Knighton, Leicestershire, England
- Batting: Right-handed
- Bowling: Right-arm medium

Domestic team information
- Years: Team
- 1912–1920: Leicestershire

Career statistics
Competition	First-class
Matches	3
Runs scored	29
Batting average	5.80
100s/50s	–/–
Top score	11
Balls bowled	120
Wickets	–
Bowling average	–
5 wickets in innings	–
10 wickets in match	–
Best bowling	–
Catches/stumpings	–/–
- Source: Cricinfo, 23 January 2013

Harry King (6 November 1881 – 30 June 1947) was an English cricketer. King was a right-handed batsman who bowled right-arm medium pace. He was born at Leicester, Leicestershire.

King made his first-class debut for Leicestershire against Nottinghamshire in the 1912 County Championship at Aylestone Road, Leicester. He next appeared in first-class cricket for the county in 1920, making two appearances in that seasons County Championship against Gloucestershire and Somerset. In his three matches, he scored a total of 29 runs at an average of 5.80, with a high score of 11.

He died at South Knighton, Leicestershire on 30 June 1947.
