= Harry Bass (cricketer) =

English cricketer

Henry John Bass (14 October 1852 – 24 January 1904) was an English cricket groundsman who played three first-class cricket matches between 1871 and 1875. Bass played for Kent County Cricket Club and was groundsman at the club's St Lawrence Ground in Canterbury for 25 years.

Bass was born in Canterbury in 1852, the son of a wood merchant, and lived all of his life in the city. He played twice for Kent in 1871 and appeared in one match in 1875 but scored only 11 runs in his six innings. He held the post of groundsman until his sudden death from a heart attack in January 1904 at the age of 51.

== Bibliography ==
- Carlaw, Derek (2020). Kent County Cricketers, A to Z: Part One (1806–1914) (PDF). Cardiff: ACS.
