= Harry Wilkinson (rugby union) =

England international rugby union player

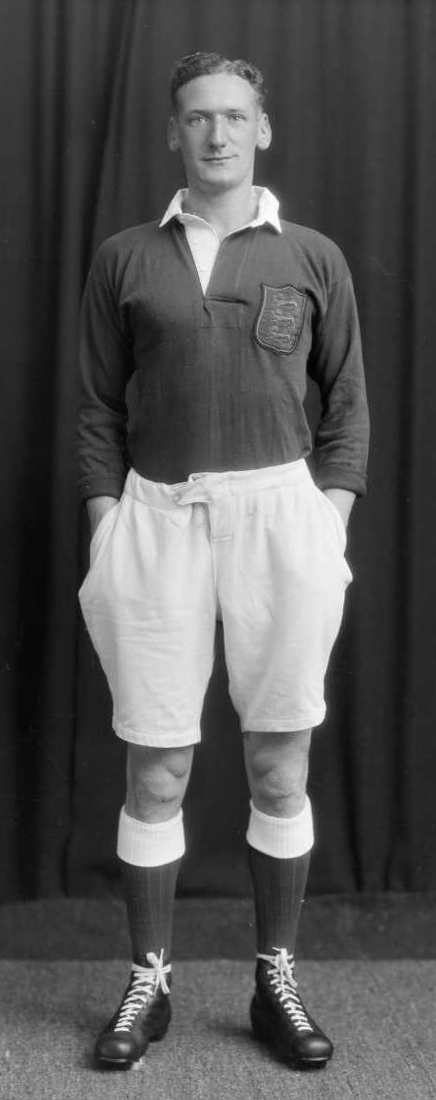
- Wilkinson in New Zealand in 1930
- Full name: Harry Wilkinson
- Born: 22 March 1903 Halifax, West Riding of Yorkshire, England
- Died: 1 October 1988 (aged 85) Hastings, New Zealand
- Notable relative: Harry Wilkinson snr (father)

Rugby union career
- Position: Flanker
Senior career
Years	Team	Apps	(Points)
–	Halifax RUFC		
–	Yorkshire		
International career
Years	Team	Apps	(Points)
1929-30	England	4	(6)

Harry Wilkinson (22 March 1903 – 1 October 1988) was an English rugby union footballer who played in the 1920s. He played at representative level for England, and Yorkshire, and at club level for Halifax RUFC, as a flanker. He died in Hastings, New Zealand.

== International honours ==
Harry Wilkinson won caps for England while at Halifax in 1929 against Wales, Ireland, and Scotland, and in 1930 against France.

== Personal life ==
Harry Wilkinson was the son of the rugby union footballer Harry Wilkinson.
