= Harry Young (musician) =

Australian singer and songwriter

Harry Charles Young (1951–2023) was an Australian singer and songwriter, active primarily in the rock genre.

== Career ==
Young gained national attention in 1971 with his group, Harry Young & Sabbath. The band recorded for the independent label Du Monde during Australia's 1971 radio ban, a period when major label music was restricted from airplay. Harry Young & Sabbath consisted of Young, former members of the group Wheelbarrow, and two musicians who would later join the band Sherbet (bassist Tony Mitchell and guitarist Tony Leigh). In 1971, the band had two charting singles in Australia: a cover of Christie’s "San Bernadino" (Top 30) and "The Wheat in the Field" (Top 10). A prior compilation album, Recollections, had been released in 1970. A subsequent single failed to chart, and the group disbanded.

Following the dissolution of the band, Young founded a recording studio, Pump Room Studio, in Kyogle, New South Wales, and released several solo projects, including the albums After Harvest (2018) and Road to Damascus (2021).

In his later career, Young performed as part of the "Memories: A Tribute to Ted Mulry" tour. He was also the lead vocalist on the album At the End of the Rainbow, a project by the original members of Billy Thorpe & the Aztecs. Despite a cancer diagnosis in 2019, he continued writing and released the single "Standing on the Edge of the Wall" in 2020 from his home studio, describing the song as "a salute to second chances."
