= Ait Abdallah =

- Rural commune and town
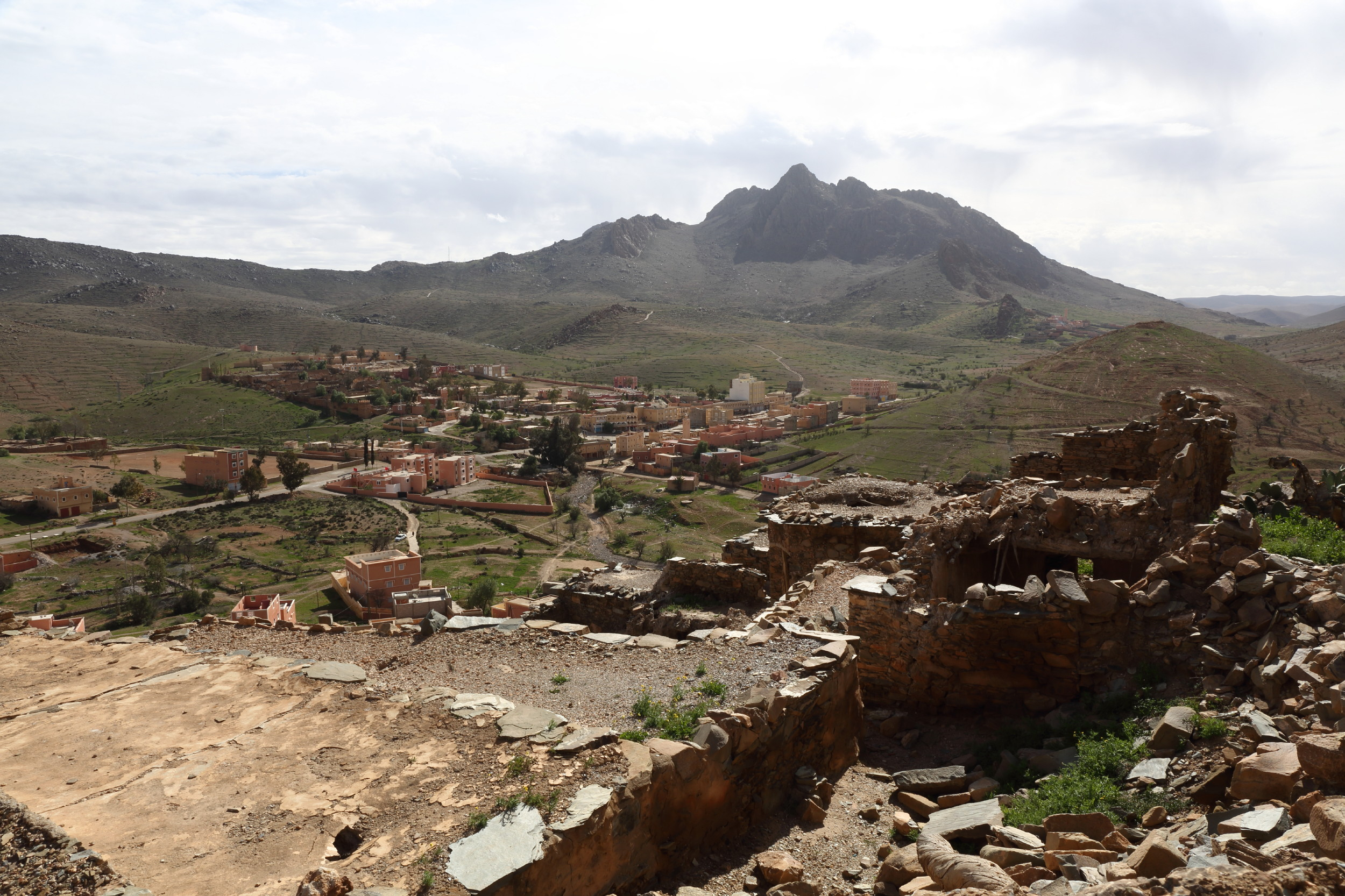
- Interactive map of Ait Abdallah
- Coordinates: 29.81345°N 8.76454°W
- Country: Morocco
- Region: Souss-Massa
- Province: Taroudant Province

Population (2004)
  - Total: 2,988
- Time zone: UTC+0 (GMT)

Ait Abdallah is a small town and rural commune in Taroudant Province of the Souss-Massa region of Morocco. At the time of the 2004 census, the commune had a total population of 2,988 people living in 791 households. As of the 2014 census, the population was 2,086, with 643 households.
