= Robert Wilson (Scottish footballer) =

Scottish footballer

Personal information
- Place of birth: Scotland
- Position: Right half

Senior career*
Years	Team	Apps	(Gls)
–	Maryhill		
1909–1913	Partick Thistle	94	(2)

International career
1910–1911	Scottish League XI	2	(0)
- * Club domestic league appearances and goals

Robert Wilson was a Scottish footballer who played for Partick Thistle, mainly as a right half. He featured prominently for the Jags for four seasons, making 116 appearances in all competitions including the Glasgow Cup final of 1911, but very little is noted of any career thereafter – it was suggested that he joined Chelsea in 1913, but there is no record of him playing for the West London club in any official competitions.

Wilson was selected twice for the Scottish Football League XI, both against the Irish League XI in 1910 and 1911.
