= Harry Wong =

American educator and author

Harry K. Wong (1932–2024) was an American educationalist, author, and motivational speaker.

== Early life and education ==
Wong was born in 1932 in San Francisco to Chinese-American parents. He grew up during a period when Asian Americans faced overt discrimination, which strongly influenced his views on discipline, professionalism, and institutional respect. He earned degrees in science and education, eventually completing a doctorate (EdD), and began his career as a secondary school science teacher.

== The First Days of School ==
Wong's first and most notable book was The First Days of School: How to Be an Effective Teacher and New Teacher Induction, which has sold over 3.5 million copies and has had five editions printed. Wong's publications provide advice on the improvement of academic instruction, classroom management and teacher expectations of students. He draws a distinction between classroom "discipline" and classroom "management" and suggests that through clear procedures and routines, teachers can promote behaviors avoid infractions, punishments, and ultimately, lost productive time in a classroom. He also asserted that the first few minutes with students on the first day can lead to the long-term success or failure of a teacher.

== Criticism ==
Wong's work has faced some criticism for its current relevance. Critics often cite that the management techniques in the book have become outdated, rely on supportive parents and administration, and call for punitive measures. Wong’s approach has been criticized for being overly prescriptive and compliance-oriented, emphasizing order and routine at the expense of student agency, dialogue, and cultural responsiveness. Critics argue that his model assumes a uniform classroom context and insufficiently accounts for differences in student backgrounds, school cultures, and pedagogical aims. Some educational theorists also contend that his focus on procedural control prioritizes classroom efficiency over deeper learning, critical thinking, and relational or emotional forms of education. Proponents of Wong counter that novice teachers in particular require clear, explicit structure to establish functional classrooms, reduce early-career burnout, and create the stability necessary for learning to occur.

== Death and legacy ==
Wong passed away at the age of 91 on February 20, 2024. Wong is remembered as a highly influential and pragmatic figure in education, respected for providing clear, actionable guidance to novice teachers. His work, particularly the ideas popularized in his instructional materials, has been widely used as a foundation in new teacher induction programs and as a central focus of sustained professional development across many schools and districts in the United States and internationally. Many education programs assign his principles as standard reading for novice teachers,
