= Harry Woodward (footballer, born 1919) =

English footballer

Personal information
- Full name: Harry George Woodward
- Date of birth: 29 August 1919
- Place of birth: Bromley, England
- Date of death: September 1984 (aged 65)
- Place of death: Barking, England
- Position: Centre half

Senior career*
Years	Team	Apps	(Gls)
- Chelmsford City
1946–1952	Southend United	14	(0)
- Tonbridge
- * Club domestic league appearances and goals

Harry George Woodward (29 August 1919 – September 1984) was an English footballer who played as a centre half.

== Career ==
Woodward began his career with Chelmsford City. In 1946, Woodward signed for Southend United. Over the course of six years, Woodward made 14 appearances for Southend in the Football League. After leaving Southend, Woodward had a spell with Tonbridge.
