= Harry J. Wienbergen =

American sports coach, athletics administrator, and educator (1900–1974)

Biographical details
- Born: October 21, 1900; Platteville, Wisconsin, U.S.
- Died: March 6, 1974 (aged 73); Dickinson, North Dakota, U.S.

Coaching career (HC unless noted)

Football
- 1921–1926: Mount Horeb HS (WI)
- 1928–1943: Dickinson State
- 1946–1949: Dickinson State
- 1951–1952: Dickinson State

Head coaching record
- Overall: 50–71–13 (college football)

Accomplishments and honors

Championships
- 1 NDIC (1951)

Harry J. Wienbergen (October 21, 1900 – March 6, 1974) was an American sports coach, athletics administrator, and educator. He coach American football, basketball, and track and field at Dickinson State College—now known as Dickinson State University—in Dickinson, North Dakota, and was the school's athletic director. Wienbergen was the head football coach at Dickinson State, serving three stints, from 1928 to 1943, 1946 to 1949, and 1951 to 1952.

Wienbergen was born on October 21, 1900, in Platteville, Wisconsin. He attended Platteville Normal School—now known as University of Wisconsin–Platteville. He earned Bachelor of Science degree in health and physical education in 1927 and a Master of Science degree in 1936 from the University of Wisconsin–Madison. Wienbergen began his coaching career in 1921, at Mount Horeb High School, in Mount Horeb, Wisconsin. He joined the faculty at Dickinson State in 1927.

Wienbergen died on March 6, 1974, on at St. Joseph's Hospital in Dickinson.

== Head coaching record ==
=== College football ===
Year	Team	Overall	Conference	Standing	Bowl/playoffs
Dickinson State Savages (Interstate Athletic Conference) (1928–1931)
1928	Dickinson State	2–4	1–3	T–7th	
1929	Dickinson State	0–6			
1930	Dickinson State	3–3	2–1	T–2nd	
1931	Dickinson State	1–4–2			
Dickinson State Savages (North Dakota Intercollegiate Athletic Conference / North Dakota Intercollegiate Conference) (1932–1943)
1932	Dickinson State	2–2–2	2–1–1	T–3rd	
1933	Dickinson State	5–1	3–1	2nd	
1934	Dickinson State	3–3–1	2–2–1	T–3rd	
1935	Dickinson State	3–1–1	2–1–1	2nd	
1936	Dickinson State	2–3–1	2–3	4th	
1937	Dickinson State	2–5	0–5	T–7th	
1938	Dickinson State	1–3–2	1–2–1	T–5th	
1939	Dickinson State	1–4–1	1–3–1	T–5th	
1940	Dickinson State	3–3–1	3–2–1	T–4th	
1941	Dickinson State	2–3	2–2	T–4th	
1942	No team–World War II				
1943	Dickinson State	1–2			
Dickinson State Savages (North Dakota Intercollegiate Conference) (1946–1949)
1946	Dickinson State	2–4	1–3	T–5th	
1947	Dickinson State	0–6–2	0–4–1	7th	
1948	Dickinson State	3–5	2–3	T–6th	
1949	Dickinson State	5–3	3–2	T–4th	
Dickinson State Savages (North Dakota Intercollegiate Conference) (1951–1952)
1951	Dickinson State	4–3	4–0	T–1st	
1952	Dickinson State	5–3	3–3	5th	
Dickinson State:		50–71–13			
Total:		50–71–13			
National championship Conference title Conference division title or championship game berth
