= Harry Wilkes =

English footballer (1907–1984)

Personal information
- Full name: Harry Theodore Wilkes
- Date of birth: 24 June 1907
- Place of birth: Sedgley, England
- Date of death: 5 April 1984 (aged 76)
- Place of death: Derby, England
- Position: Goalkeeper

Youth career
- 1925–1926: Sedgley Congregationals
- 1926–1927: Wellington Town

Senior career*
Years	Team	Apps	(Gls)
1927–1934	Derby County	208	(0)
1934–1935	Sheffield United		
1935–1936	Rhyl Athletic		
- Heanor Town
- * Club domestic league appearances and goals

Harry Theodore Wilkes (24 June 1907 – 5 April 1984) was an English professional footballer who played as a goalkeeper, most notably for Derby County.

== Career ==
=== Early career ===
Wilkes started his footballing career at playing for hometown Sedgley Congregationals in 1925, before joining Wellington Town in 1926.

=== Derby County ===
In February 1927, Wilkes would join First Division Derby County to start his professional football career. Initially, Wilkes would act as backup to Ben Olney and he would make his senior league debut in a 4–0 victory at the Baseball Ground against Arsenal on 24 September 1927. Olney would soon after leave to join Aston Villa and Wilkes would take over as first choice keeper. He would make 31 appearances in the 1927–28 season. In the 1928–29 season, Wilkes would only miss one game as he played 44 games. In the 1929–30 season, Wilkes would only miss five games as Derby would finish runners-up in the league championship, playing in 40 first team matches. Another 40 appearances were made in the 1930–31 season and 43 in the 1931–32 season Wilkes would start the 1932–33 season as first choice but would lose his place in the team to Jack Kirby in December 1932. Wilkes made the last of his 220 appearances for Derby in a 4–1 loss at Blackpool on 27 December 1932.

=== Later career ===
Wilkes would join Sheffield United in March 1934. He would make 14 appearances in total, as he was mainly used as a back up to Jack Smith and Roy John. He play three times in United's 1933–34 season relegation season, which ended his top flight career, after making 211 career First Division appearances. Wilkes joined Rhyl Athletic in October 1935, before ending his career at Heanor Town, joining them in 1936.

== Personal life ==
After football, Wilkes lived in Derby and owned a fish and chip shop with his wife Effie in Cowsley Road, Chaddesden. He was a part of the congregation in the funeral of former teammate Tommy Cooper who died in a motorcycle crash in June 1940, whilst playing for Liverpool.

== Death ==
Wilkes died on 5 April 1984, in Derby aged 76.
