= Harry Wilkinson (footballer, born 1903) =

English footballer (1903–1997)

Personal information
- Full name: Harry Wilkinson
- Date of birth: 2 May 1903
- Place of birth: Derker, England
- Date of death: 1997 (aged 93–94)
- Position: Half-back

Senior career*
Years	Team	Apps	(Gls)
1918–1919	Albert Mount		
1919	Wellington Albion		
1919–1923	Werneth Amateurs		
1923–1926	Oldham Athletic	17	(0)
1926–1927	Bolton Wanderers	0	(0)
1927–1928	Mossley		
1928–1929	Southport	4	(0)
1928	Ashton National		
Total		21	(0)
- * Club domestic league appearances and goals

Harry Wilkinson (2 May 1903 – 1997) was an English footballer who played in the Football League for Oldham Athletic and Southport.
