= Harry Paulet =

British mariner

- Died: 1804; Lambeth
- Occupation: Mariner

Harry Paulet (died 1804) was a British master-mariner.

== Biography ==
Paulet is said to have been the master of a small vessel trading to North America; to have been captured by the enemy in 1758, and taken to Quebec; and, being known as a good pilot for the St. Lawrence, to have been sent a prisoner to Europe. The ship in which he sailed put into Vigo, and Paulet, being allowed access to the cabin, laid hold of a packet of despatches, carelessly left within his reach, and dropped overboard. There were two English men-of-war in the river, and Paulet, with the packet of despatches in his mouth, swam to one of these and was taken on board. The despatches proved to be of great value, and Paulet was sent with a copy of them to Lisbon, and thence in a sloop of war to England. In London he was examined by the authorities, and, on the information which he gave and that which was contained in the despatches, the expedition of 1759 was organised, Paulet being rewarded with ‘the pay of a lieutenant for life.’ This annuity of 90l. a year enabled him, it is said, to purchase a vessel, in which he ran cargoes of brandy from the French coast. On one voyage he fell in with the French fleet which had escaped out of Brest ‘while Edward Hawke lay concealed behind the rocks of Ushant.’ Paulet, risking his brandy for the love of his country, ran to find the English fleet, and demanded to speak with the admiral. He was ordered on board the flagship, and, having told his story, was assured by Hawke that if it was true, he would make his fortune; if false, he would hang him at the yard-arm. The fleet then got under way, and Paulet, at his special request, was permitted to stay on board. In the battle which followed he behaved with the utmost gallantry, and was sent home ‘rewarded in such a manner as enabled him to live happily the remainder of his life.’

Such is Paulet's own story, which he very probably brought himself, in his old age, to believe. But wherever it can be tested it is false, and no part of it can be accepted as true. If, in the end of 1758, the admiralty had had a first-rate pilot for the St. Lawrence at their disposal, that pilot would have been sent to the St. Lawrence with Saunders; and, if he had been examined either by the admiralty or the secretary of state, there would be some record of the examination; but there is no such record. We may be quite sure that if he had been granted the pay of a lieutenant for life, the amount would be charged somewhere; but it does not appear. Again, when Conflans came out of Brest on 14 November 1759, the English fleet was not ‘concealed behind the rocks of Ushant;’ nor was it ever at anchor there. Hawke learned of the escape of Conflans from the master of a victualler, which, on its way from the squadron in Quiberon Bay, saw the French fleet making for Belle Isle. It is barely possible that Paulet was the victualler and gave the information. In some way or other he certainly made money, and in his old age was generous to the poor of his neighbourhood. He is said to have been an admirable narrator of his own adventures or of Hawke's battle. He died in Lambeth in 1804.
