= Harry Wingham =

English footballer (1895–1969)

Personal information
- Full name: Harold Charles Wingham
- Date of birth: 25 June 1895
- Place of birth: Selsey, England
- Date of death: 1969 (aged 73–74)
- Position: Full-back

Senior career*
Years	Team	Apps	(Gls)
1922–1923	Thornycroft Athletic		
1923–1924	Bournemouth & Boscombe Athletic	18	(0)
1924–1925	Clapton Orient	5	(0)
1925–1927	Norwich City	43	(1)
1927	Salisbury City		
Total		66	(1)
- * Club domestic league appearances and goals

Harold Charles Wingham (25 June 1895 – 1969) was an English footballer who played in the Football League for Bournemouth & Boscombe Athletic, Clapton Orient and Norwich City.
