= Harry Woodcock =

English footballer (1928–2003)

Personal information
- Full name: Harold Woodcock
- Date of birth: 18 September 1928
- Place of birth: Darlington, England
- Date of death: 31 March 2003 (aged 74)
- Place of death: Darlington, England
- Positions: Wing half; inside right

Senior career*
Years	Team	Apps	(Gls)
1952–195?	Darlington	5	(0)
1954–195?	Blackhall Colliery Welfare		
- * Club domestic league appearances and goals

Harold Woodcock (18 September 1928 – 31 March 2003), commonly known as Harry Woodcock, was an English footballer who played for Darlington in the Football League.

== Life and career ==
Woodcock was born in Darlington, County Durham, and joined his hometown club, Darlington F.C. of the Football League Third Division North, in August 1952. He made his debut during the 1952–53 season, and made five League appearances in total, including at right half against Wrexham in March 1953 and at inside right against York City in January 1954, but played mostly for the reserve team in the North-Eastern League. In December 1953, he scored four times, including a first-half hat-trick, as Darlington Reserves won 6–3 away to Ashington. He was still on Darlington's books in 1954–55, but was loaned to North-Eastern League club Blackhall Colliery Welfare in November 1954; he made a "pleasing debut" playing at left half against Stockton, and also appeared at centre half. Woodcock died in Darlington at the age of 74.
