= Harry Wilson (Scottish footballer) =

Scottish footballer

Personal information
- Place of birth: Scotland
- Position: Left half

Senior career*
Years	Team	Apps	(Gls)
–	Petershill		
1903–1909	Partick Thistle	116	(2)
1909–1910	Vale of Leven	8	(1)
- * Club domestic league appearances and goals

Harry Wilson was a Scottish footballer who played for Partick Thistle, mainly as a left half. He featured prominently for the Jags for six seasons after joining in 1903, making 161 appearances in all competitions including the Glasgow Merchants Charity Cup final of 1905, before joining Vale of Leven in 1909. Some sources suggest he was selected for the Scottish Football League XI, but the player involved was Robert Wilson who joined Partick almost at the same time Harry departed.
