= Harry Woodward (footballer, born 1887) =

English footballer

Personal information
- Full name: Harry Woodward
- Date of birth: 1887
- Place of birth: England
- Position: Full-back

Senior career*
Years	Team	Apps	(Gls)
19xx–1908	Hednesford Town		
1908–1910	Burnley	3	(0)
- * Club domestic league appearances and goals

Harry Woodward (1887 – after 1909) was an English professional footballer who played as a full-back. He played non-league football for Hednesford Town before joining Football League Second Division side Burnley in October 1908. Woodward made his league debut for Burnley on 13 March 1909 in the 1–2 defeat away at Wolverhampton Wanderers. He played two more matches the following season before leaving the club in the summer of 1910.
