= Harry Ward (athlete) =

Baseball player (1900–1965)

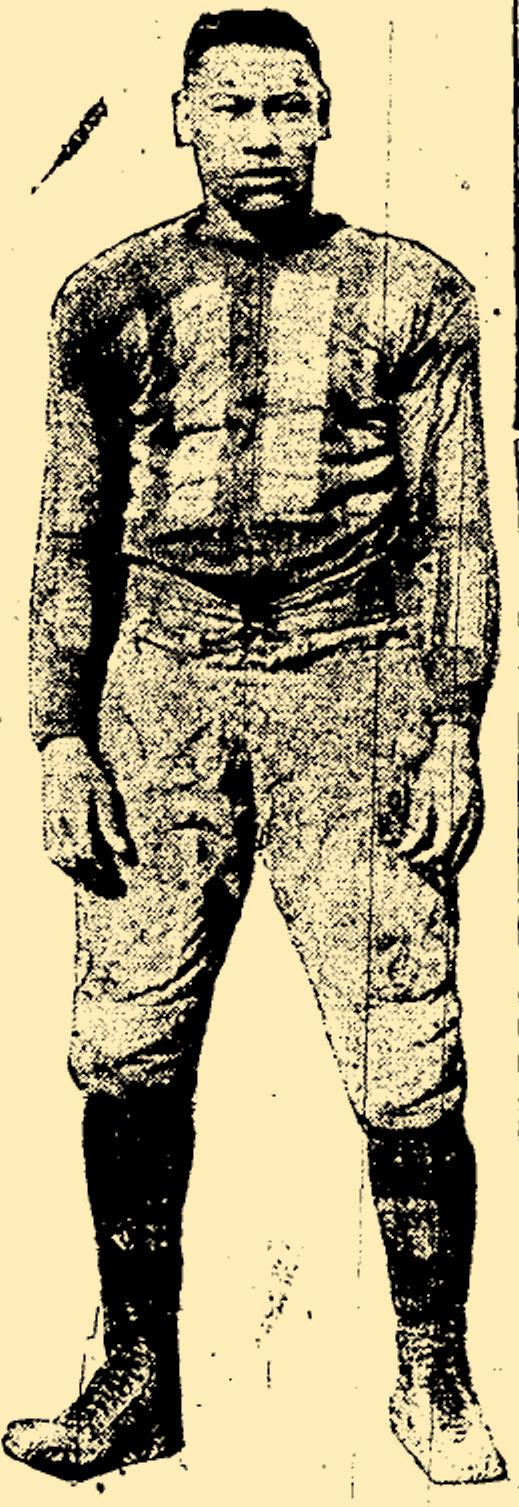

Profile
- Positions: Tailback, Placekicker

Personal information
- Listed height: 6 ft 0 in (1.83 m)
- Listed weight: 183 lb (83 kg)

Career information
- College: Wilberforce University 1923-1928

Harry "Wu Fang" Ward
- Outfielder

Professional debut
- 1934, for the Cincinnati Tigers

Teams
- Cincinnati Tigers (1934-1935)

Harry G. "Wu Fang" Ward (1900 – May 26, 1965) was an American college and professional athlete in the 1920s and 1930s.

== College career ==
=== Football ===
Ward teamed up with Halley Harding at Wilberforce University as a running back and placekicker. Called upon heavily during games, he was described in one account as a "consistent gainer" with "the speed of a Mercury." In 1925, Ward experienced a breakout season, running for 98 yards in a single quarter against Linden Center in Dayton, Ohio and scoring three touchdowns against Lincoln. He scored an additional three touchdowns against Kentucky State, gathering the attention of Pittsburgh Courier, which stated "Ward is never completely stopped. Aside from his running, Ward is a deadly tackler, a good punter, a good passer, and is first on the interference." At the end of the season, Ward was named to the fullback position of the newspaper's very first All-American team. In 1926 he missed time due to injuries from running a nail into his hand., but stayed true to form when he was on the field, scoring a 98-yard touchdown during a 16–0 win over Bluefield Institute. He made national headlines again in late October when he intercepted a pass and scored an 80-yard touchdown in a 7–0 win over Lincoln at Forbes Field in Pittsburgh. Ward wrapped up his college football career on Thanksgiving Day in 1928, kicking a game-tying field goal in the closing moments of a 13–13 tie against West Virginia State in Cleveland.

=== Basketball ===
In 1925, Ward was named captain of the basketball team at Wilberforce, playing at the forward, guard, and center positions.

=== Track and field ===
On the track and field team at Wilberforce, Ward participated in the shot put and discus throws, running broad jump, and sprinting events. He also took part in relay events, running the 220 yard dash in less than 23 seconds. At the YMCA Invitational meet in Springfield, Ohio in May 1924, Ward won the shot put and discus events with a throws of 39 feet, 6 inches and 87 feet, 9 inches respectively.

=== Baseball ===
Ward also played first base and pitched for Wilberforce's baseball team. On April 26, 1926, Ward had a career day at the plate against Defiance College, hitting a home run on a full count and later knocking in two more runs with a walk off inside the park home run.

=== Other sports ===
In 1924 the Baltimore Afro-American called Ward "the Jim Thorpe of today," noting his abilities in tennis, wrestling, and gymnastics in addition to his baseball, football, and basketball exploits.

== Coaching ==
In 1930, Ward was named to the football coaching staff at Wilberforce, specializing in the backfield.

== Professional basketball career ==
In 1926, Ward joined former Olympian and fellow Cincinnati native DeHart Hubbard on the Chester Comets, a Black Fives era team that played in Cincinnati. Ward and Hubbard were briefly courted by the Baltimore Athenians, a barnstorming club, but neither signed with the team. Ward continued to team up with Hubbard on several local teams including the Cincinnati Cardinals and Cincinnati Lion Tamers. In addition to his time in the Queen City, he also spent time with Cumberland Posey's Homestead Grays and Pittsburgh Loendi Five clubs.

== Baseball career ==
=== Springfield Eddie's Tailors ===
Following college, Ward played shortstop and right field for "Eddie's Tailors" of Springfield, Ohio.

=== Excelsior Nine ===
Ward played on basketball teammate DeHart Hubbard's Cincinnati Excelsior Nine amateur baseball team, an early forerunner to the Cincinnati Tigers. Ward returned to manage the team in 1943.

=== Cincinnati Tigers ===
Ward moved with multiple core players from Excelsior to the new Cincinnati Tigers, also created and owned by Hubbard. In 1934, Ward hit a documented .478 in seven games for the Tigers of the Negro Southern League, though complete data is sparse. By October, Ward was identified as the Tigers' manager. Ward remained with the club in 1935. Among his highlights in 1935 was a three hit game against the Memphis Red Sox, including a home run and a base hit that put advanced Neil Robinson into scoring position.

=== Umpiring ===
After concluding his playing career, Ward worked as an umpire in the Cincinnati area, for both the Negro Leagues and local teams. He umpired the 1944 Negro World Series between the Homestead Grays and Birmingham Black Barons, and in 1945 he was chosen to work the East-West All-Star Game in Chicago, which featured Jackie Robinson and Roy Campanella. In July 1945, Ward was honored during pregame ceremonies of a Cincinnati Clowns-Memphis Red Sox game for his "long and meritorious career as an arbiter".

== Personal life ==
Upon graduation from Wilberforce, Ward taught at the Douglass School, one of the only schools available for African American children in Cincinnati at the time. He also worked at the Cincinnati Recreation Commission, Cincinnati Milling Machine Company, and Ohio State Liquor Department. On April 18, 1927, he married Sephronia Simpson in Newport, Kentucky. They had two children.

== Death and legacy ==
On May 29, 1965, Ward collapsed and died at the Hamilton County Courthouse, where he worked in Cincinnati, the day after umpiring a baseball game. He was remembered as a "leader in promoting youthful athletic activities in the Queen City" and left behind a wife, two daughters, and four grandchildren. Ward was 64 years old. He was interred at United American Cemetery in Cincinnati. In 1975, Cincinnati sportswriter and broadcaster Dick Bray wrote of Ward, "it has always been of the writer's opinion that Harry Ward would have been the first Black ballplayer had the rules been the same as they were when Jackie Robinson became eligible to perform in the Major Leagues." In 1988, Ward was briefly profiled in "The Cincinnati Game", a book about the history of baseball in Cincinnati.
