= Henry Wilson (cricketer) =

Australian cricketer

Personal information
- Born: 31 March 1865; Westbury, Tasmania, Australia
- Died: 18 August 1914 (aged 49); Sydney, Australia

Domestic team information
- Years: Team
- 1889-1901: Tasmania
- Source: Cricinfo, 14 January 2016

Henry Wilson (31 March 1865 – 18 August 1914) was an Australian cricketer. He played six first-class matches for Tasmania between 1889 and 1901.

== See also ==
- List of Tasmanian representative cricketers
