= Harry Wilkinson (rugby) =

England international rugby union footballer (1864–1942)

Harry James Wilkinson
- Full name: Harry James Wilkinson
- Born: second ¼ 1864 Halifax, England
- Died: 7 June 1942 (aged 78) Halifax, England
- Notable relative: Harry Wilkinson jnr (son)

Rugby union career
- Position: Forwards
Senior career
Years	Team	Apps	(Points)
–	Halifax		
–	Yorkshire		
International career
Years	Team	Apps	(Points)
1889	England	1	(0)

Harry James Wilkinson (second ¼ 1864 – 7 June 1942) was an English rugby union footballer who played in the 1880s. He played at representative level for England, and Yorkshire, and at club level for Halifax, as a forward, e.g. front row, lock, or back row. Prior to Tuesday 27 August 1895, Halifax was a rugby union club.

== Background ==
Harry Wilkinson was born in Halifax, West Riding of Yorkshire, and he died aged 78 in Halifax, West Riding of Yorkshire.

== Playing career ==
=== International honours ===
Harry Wilkinson won a cap for England while at Halifax in 1889 against New Zealand Natives, during the match Harry Wilkinson wore his Yorkshire County Shirt rather than an England shirt.

== Personal life ==
Harry Wilkinson was the father of the rugby union footballer Harry Wilkinson.
