= Harry L. Billings =

American journalist

- Born: Harry Leroy Billings; January 30, 1913; Somerton, Montana
- Died: April 23, 1990; Apache Junction, Arizona
- Citizenship: United States
- Education: University of Montana, bachelor's degree in journalism (1933)
- Occupation: Journalist
- Employer(s): The People's Voice, American Federation of Labor and Congress of Industrial Organizations
- Known for: Editor of The People’s Voice, progressive advocacy

Harry L. Billings (1913-1990) was a journalist and civil rights advocate who co-owned and -operated a newspaper called The People's Voice in Montana.

== Early life ==
Harry L. Billings was born on January 30, 1913. in Somerton, Montana to Ray Billings and Edna Hannaway. He graduated from Thompson Falls High School and attended the University of Montana in Missoula, where he earned a degree in journalism in 1933.

== Journalism career ==
In 1946, Harry joined the staff of The People's Voice, an independent, politically progressive newspaper in Helena, Montana His wife Gretchen joined him two years later. In 1948, Harry became the managing editor for the paper in conjunction with Gretchen. They held this position for twenty years until their coworker Bennett Hansen took over the work in 1968. Harry resigned from the paper following “a lengthy dispute with organized labor over support of the Vietnam War”.

== Work in social activism ==
Following his work with The People's Voice, Harry spent two and a half years as the director of Education and Research for the Montana State American Federation of Labor and Congress of Industrial Organizations (AFL-CIO). Throughout his life, he advocated for the cause of progressivism and for other left-leaning organizations.

== Personal life ==
On October 11, 1933, Harry Leroy Billings married Gretchen Garber. Gretchen Garber grew up in Whitefish, and her grandparents “homesteaded the Plains area in the mid-1880s”. Gretchen worked with Harry on the newspaper. The couple had three children together: John, Leon, and Mike.

== Awards and recognition ==
Harry L. Billings won the Montana Newspaper Hall of Fame award in 1997, and Gretchen Garber Billings won the award in 2007. In 1983, Harry won the University of Montana Distinguished Alumnus Award. Harry was also a member of the Montanan Bicentennial advisory council in the mid-1970s.

== Later years ==
The Billingses retired to their home in Thompson Falls in the 1980s and moved to Apache Junction in Arizona after Harry began suffering from respiratory problems. Harry died on April 23, 1990. Currently, Harry and Gretchen's papers are held by Archives and Special Collections at Montana State University.
