= Sailing at the 2025 Island Games =

- Venue: Orkney
- Dates: 13–17 July 2025
- Nations: 12

The Sailing events at the 2025 Island Games in Orkney took place from 13 to 17 July 2025.

== Events ==
- ILCA 7 Laser Standard
- ILCA 6 Laser Radial
- Sailing Team Event

=== Medal table ===
* Host nation (Orkney)

2025 Island Games Medals
Rank	Nation	Gold	Silver	Bronze	Total
1	Isle of Wight (IOW)	3	0	1	4
2	Ynys Môn	0	2	0	2
3	Menorca	0	1	0	1
4	Cayman Islands (CAY)	0	0	1	1
4	Guernsey (GUE)	0	0	1	1
Totals (5 entries)		3	3	3	9

=== Participating islands ===
- Åland Islands
- Cayman Islands
- Gibraltar
- Guernsey
- Hitra
- Isle of Man
- Isle of Wight
- Jersey
- Menorca
- Orkney (Host)
- Shetland Islands
- (Anglesey) Ynys Môn

== Results ==
Event	Gold		Silver		Bronze	
ILCA 7	Arthur Farley; Isle of Wight	9	Josh Metcalfe; Ynys Môn	32	Harry White; Isle of Wight	38
ILCA 6	Oliver Mayo; Isle of Wight	12	Ines Maria Abreu Garcia; Menorca	33.5	Nicole Stovell; Cayman Islands	44
Team event	Isle of Wight; Arthur Farley; Oliver Mayo; Oliver Smith; Harry White	62	Ynys Môn; Alistair Dickson; Catherine Elson; Josh Metcalfe; Benjamin Todd	146	Guernsey; David Aslett; Monty Desforges; Darragh Lee; Jessica Watson	178
