= Harry Waldow =

American artist (1887–1969)

Harry Waldow (1887–1969) was an American artist who spent much of his professional life in Tranås, Sweden.

Born in Dayton, Ohio in 1887 to a British architect father and a Mexican mother, Waldow left his family home and the United States at age 15. He went first to England to seek out his paternal grandmother, but she rejected him. At 17, he began studying art in London, later continuing his studies in Amsterdam and Paris. He traveled around Europe and eventually ended up in Sweden, where he settled in the small town of Tranås in 1923.

Waldow was an active artist in southern Sweden and held solo exhibitions in Tranås and Karlshamn. He participated in the 1914 Baltic Exhibition in Malmö and in a few group exhibitions of provincial art. He gave one newspaper interview in his lifetime, for the Östgöta Correspondenten in 1947. His art consists of symbolic figurative paintings, realistic still lifes and landscape paintings, particularly featuring Lake Sommen in oils, gouache, watercolors or sketches. A beloved Tranås figure, Waldow's work is featured at the Tranås health clinic and in several other places in the Municipality of Tranås.
