= Harry D. Weller =

American football, basketball, and baseball coach

Coaching career (HC unless noted)

Football
- 1918: Franklin & Marshall
- 1926–1927: Albright

Basketball
- 1917–1918: Franklin & Marshall
- 1924–1926: Franklin & Marshall

Baseball
- 1925–1926: Franklin & Marshall

Head coaching record
- Overall: 11–8–1 (football); 15–22 (basketball); 14–14 (baseball)

Harry D. "Jake" Weller was an American football, basketball, and baseball coach. He was the head football coach at Franklin & Marshall College in Lancaster, Pennsylvania for one season, in 1918, and at Albright College from 1926 to 1927, compiling a career college football coaching record of 11–8–1. Weller served two stints at the head basketball at Franklin & Marshall, in 1917–18 and from 1924 to 1926, amassing a record of 15–22. He was also the head baseball coach there from 1926 to 1926, tallying a mark of 14–14.

== Head coaching record ==
=== Football ===
Year	Team	Overall	Conference	Standing	Bowl/playoffs
Franklin & Marshall (Independent) (1918)
1918	Franklin & Marshall	2–1			
Franklin & Marshall:		2–1			
Albright Red and White (Independent) (1926–1927)
1926	Albright	6–3			
1927	Albright	3–4–1			
Albright:		9–7–1			
Total:		11–8–1			
