= Harry Cothliff =

English footballer

Personal information
- Full name: Harold Thomas Cothliff
- Date of birth: 24 March 1916
- Place of birth: Liverpool, England
- Date of death: 1976 (aged 59–60)
- Place of death: New Zealand
- Height: 5 ft 8 1/2 in (1.74 m)
- Position: Right half

Senior career*
Years	Team	Apps	(Gls)
–1936	Prescot Cables		
1936–1937	Manchester City	0	(0)
1937–1938	Nottingham Forest	0	(0)
1938–1947	Torquay United	65	(1)
- Dartmouth
- Ilfracombe Town
- * Club domestic league appearances and goals

Harold Thomas Cothliff (24 March 1916 – 1976) was an English professional footballer who played in the Football League for Torquay United as a right half.
