= Harry Young (mayor) =

American politician (fl. 1940s)

Harry Young was the City Council President for the city of San Jose, California from 1940 to 1944. In San Jose, the council president performed the functions of mayor.

Prior to being elected to the San Jose City Council Young served as the City Auditor

In 1938 there was an attempted recall against Young and three other council members in San Jose.
