= Sailing at the 2015 Island Games =

Sailing at the 2015 Island Games was held at St Aubin's Bay, Jersey from 28 June to 2 July.

== Medal table ==
Rank	Nation	Gold	Silver	Bronze	Total
1	(Anglesey) Ynys Môn	3	0	0	3
2	Isle of Wight	0	1	1	2
2	Åland	0	1	1	2
4	Saare County	0	1	0	1
5	Bermuda	0	0	1	1
Totals (5 entries)		3	3	3	9

== Results ==
Event	Gold		Silver		Bronze	
Laser Standard Rig	Eifion Mon; Ynys Môn	13	Harry Blowers; Isle of Wight	23	Kalin Hillier; Bermuda	24
Laser Radial Rig	Benjamin Todd; Ynys Môn	30	Kristo Õunap; Saaremaa	31	Milio Schauman; Åland Islands	35
Team	Anglesey; Dominic Breen-Turner; Eifion Mon; Michael Thorne; Benjamin Todd	98	Åland Islands; Niklas Areschoug; Hemming Hanses; Måns Lundberg; Milio Schauman	146	Isle of Wight; Markus Bettum; Edward Blowers; Harry Blowers; Sophie Heritage	146
