= Harry White (cricketer, born 1897) =

English cricketer

Harry Arthur White (4 February 1897 – April 1978) was an English cricketer active from 1923 to 1934 who played for Northamptonshire (Northants). He was born in Wellingborough on 4 February 1897 and died in Hartfield, Sussex April 1978. White appeared in ten first-class matches as a righthanded batsman. He scored 173 runs with a highest score of 70 not out.
