= Harry Ward (cricketer) =

Australian cricketer

Personal information
- Born: 8 December 1924; Hobart, Tasmania, Australia
- Died: 2 December 1993 (aged 68); Hobart, Tasmania, Australia

Domestic team information
- Years: Team
- 1948–1949: Tasmania
- Source: Cricinfo, 8 March 2016

Harry Ward (8 December 1924 – 2 December 1993) was an Australian cricketer. He played one first-class match for Tasmania in 1948/49.

== See also ==
- List of Tasmanian representative cricketers
