= Harry Vickers =

Harry Vickers may refer to:

- Harry Edward Vickers (1888–1942), English criminal
- Harry Franklin Vickers (1898–1977), American inventor and industrialist
- Harry Porter Vickers (1879–1958), American baseball player
