= Harry T. Watson =

American athlete and coach (1882–1957)

Biographical details
- Born: March 28, 1882; Exeter, New Hampshire, U.S.
- Died: January 29, 1957 (aged 74); Jamestown, New York, U.S.

Playing career

Football
- 1901–1904: Williams

Coaching career (HC unless noted)

Football
- 1905: Hamilton
- 1906: Williams (assistant)
- 1907: Ursinus
- 1912–1915: Rochester (NY)

Basketball
- 1905–1906: Hamilton

Baseball
- 1906: Hamilton
- 1908: Ursinus
- 1912–1916: Rochester (NY)

Head coaching record
- Overall: 21–24–3 (football)

Harry Towle Watson (March 28, 1882 – January 29, 1957) was an American college football, basketball and baseball player and coach. He served as the head football coach at Hamilton College in 1905, Ursinus College in 1907, and the University of Rochester from 1912 to 1915. Watson was born on March 28, 1882, in Exeter, New Hampshire. He died on January 29, 1957, at his home in Jamestown, New York.

== Head coaching record ==
=== Football ===
Year	Team	Overall	Conference	Standing	Bowl/playoffs
Hamilton Continentals (Independent) (1905)
1905	Hamilton	4–3–1			
Hamilton:		4–3–1			
Ursinus (Independent) (1907)
1907	Ursinus	2–5			
Ursinus:		2–5			
Rochester Yellowjackets (Independent) (1912–1915)
1912	Rochester	3–3–2			
1913	Rochester	6–2			
1914	Rochester	3–5			
1915	Rochester	3–6			
Rochester:		15–16–2			
Total:		21–24–3			
