= Harry Whitta =

New Zealand cricketer

Personal information
- Full name: Henry Beckett Whitta
- Born: 2 March 1883; Christchurch, New Zealand
- Died: 11 July 1944 (aged 61); Christchurch
- Batting: Right-handed

Domestic team information
- Years: Team
- 1903–04 to 1919–20: Canterbury

Career statistics
Competition	First-class
Matches	19
Runs scored	749
Batting average	22.69
100s/50s	1/4
Top score	147
Balls bowled	30
Wickets	0
Bowling average	–
5 wickets in innings	–
10 wickets in match	–
Best bowling	–
Catches/stumpings	6/–
- Source: CricketArchive, 9 January 2015

Henry Beckett Whitta (2 March 1883 – 11 July 1944) played first-class cricket for Canterbury from 1904 to 1919, and played for New Zealand in the days before New Zealand played Test cricket.

"A dashing batsman of short stature, and an excellent point fieldsman", Whitta had his best season in 1913–14, when he captained Canterbury and was the leading batsman in the Plunket Shield, scoring 333 runs in four matches at an average of 47.57. Opening the batting, he scored 147 (in 260 minutes) and 41 in the 318-run victory over Auckland. Canterbury won all four matches easily. He was selected to open the batting in New Zealand's first match against the touring Australians later that season, and scored 12 and 53 (in 63 minutes) but New Zealand lost and he was one of seven players omitted for the second match. Whitta was also the leading batsman in the Christchurch competition that season, with 745 runs at 106.42 for his club Riccarton, who were defeated in the final.

Whitta later served as selector for Canterbury, and as a Test selector.
