= Harry Watts (jockey) =

Canadian thoroughbred horse racing jockey

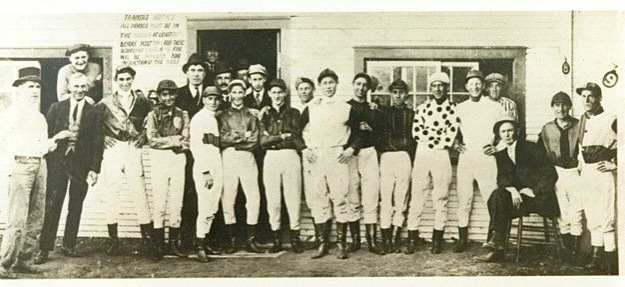
Harry Watts (7th from right), Richard Watts (13th from right), and other jockeys, trainers, and owners, at Woodbine Race Track in Toronto, Ontario, 1914.

Harry Watts (1894 – December 3, 1940) was a Canadian thoroughbred horse racing jockey. He won the 56th running of Canada's King's Plate race in 1915 on the horse Tartarean.

== Biography ==
Watts was born in 1894 in Toronto. On May 22, 1915, at Woodbine Racetrack, Watts rode Tartarean to victory for the King's Plate, finishing in 2:09.20. Watts' brother, Richard, was also a professional thoroughbred jockey. After a successful career as a jockey, Watts retired from the sport, and became a butcher. He married Myrtle E McEwan, and together they had three children. The family owned a longstanding butcher shop in Toronto's East York until Watts' death in 1940, in Toronto. He is buried in Toronto's historic St John Norway's Church Cemetery.

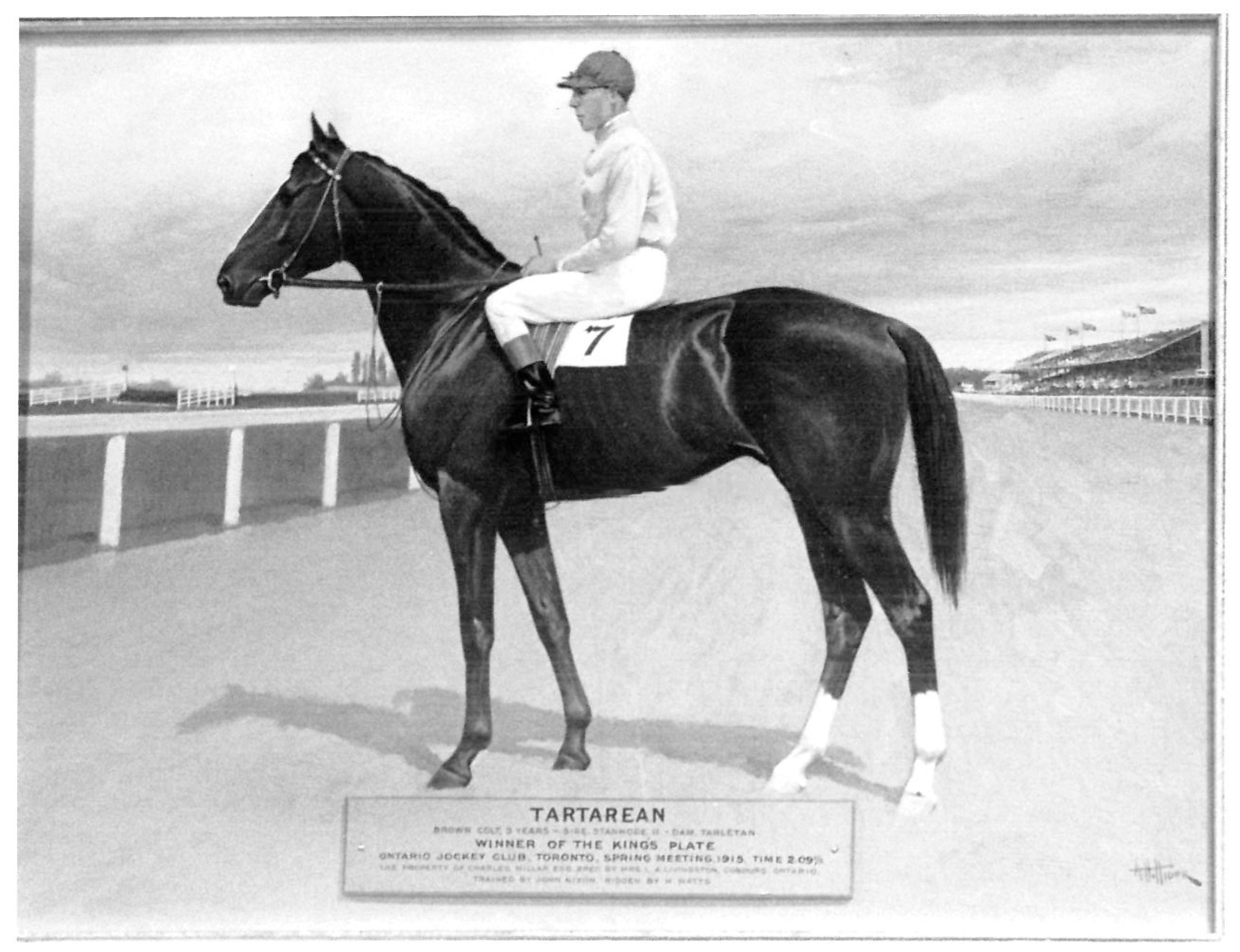
Harry Watts astride Tartarean after winning the King's Plate in 1915.

== Tartarean ==
Tartarean is described as following in Louis E. Cauz's "The Plate, A Royal Tradition":

Tartarean was a bay colt by Stanhope II, a grandson of St. Simon, from Tarletan by Uhlan. He was bred by the Pontiac Stud owned by Lily A. Livingston, owned by Charles Millar, trained by Jonn Nixon, and ridden by Harry Watts. Charles Millar came to own Tartarean and stablemate Fair Montague, who finished second, because of a rule at the time which dictated that horse owners in Ontario not only had to be residents but had to be British subjects. Mrs. Livingston, the breeder of both runners, was an American citizen. She did receive $500 from the OJC as the breeder of the winner though.

== May 22, 1915: The King's Plate race ==
Watts, trainer Nixon, and Tartaren's owner Millar were all Toronto citizens, racing in their home town for the country's most prestigious horse racing trophy. Their victory was celebrated as a victory for the city of Toronto.

A special segment titled "King's Plate For Toronto" appearing in the New York Times on May 22, 1915, described the "classic event", and surrounding excitement, as follows:

The King's Plate of 1915, which will go down into Canadian turf history as one of the best contested events in many years, was a thorough Toronto victory. [...] Wagering on the plate was unusually heavy, the heaviest, in fact, for years if the crush and turmoil around the machines was any indication.

Race favourte, Lady Curzon, was a fourth-place finisher, out performed by Pepper Sauce in third, Fair Montague in second, and Tartaren in first. While Fair Montague maintained a lead for most of the race, she "could not stall off the irresistible challenger of Tartarean, which captured the honours in the final stride."

Tartarean's performance during the King's cup race was described as following by Louis E. Cauz:

His time for the 10 furlongs on a good track was 2:09.1, five seconds off the track record. "Tartarean followed the leaders until the far turn, then moved up steadily and, finishing fast, outstayed Fair Montague in a close finish." He won by a neck with four lengths separating second and third positions.
