= Harry Wardle =

English footballer

Personal information
- Full name: Henry Wardle
- Date of birth: 1881
- Place of birth: Sunderland, England
- Date of death: 28 February 1918 (aged 36)
- Place of death: Sunderland, England
- Position: Inside forward

Senior career*
Years	Team	Apps	(Gls)
1903–1905	Sunderland	4	(2)
1905–1906	South Shields		
1906–19??	North Shields		
- * Club domestic league appearances and goals

Henry Wardle (1881 – 28 February 1918) was an English professional footballer who played as an inside forward for Sunderland. In 1918, he was killed in an industrial accident while working as a plumber at a shipyard.
