= Harry Wilson (Worcestershire cricketer) =

English cricketer

Personal information
- Full name: Harry Wilson
- Born: 1873; Yorkshire, England
- Died: 13 August 1906 (aged 32–33); Kidderminster, Wolverhampton, England
- Bowling: Slow left-arm orthodox

Domestic team information
- Years: Team
- 1900–1906: Worcestershire
- FC debut: 15 July 1901 Worcestershire v South Africans
- Last FC: 2 July 1906 Worcestershire v Kent

Career statistics
Competition	First-class
Matches	6
Runs scored	64
Batting average	8.00
100s/50s	0/0
Top score	21
Balls bowled	723
Wickets	13
Bowling average	28.69
5 wickets in innings	1
10 wickets in match	0
Best bowling	6/86
Catches/stumpings	1/–
- Source: CricketArchive, 19 November 2007

Harry Wilson (1873 – 13 August 1906) was an English first-class cricketer, who played in six matches for Worcestershire in the early 20th century.

He was born in Yorkshire, and played for the county's Colts side before moving south. For Worcestershire, he made his debut against the touring South Africans in 1901, but his most notable achievement was to take 6–86 on his County Championship debut against Surrey in June 1903, albeit in a game Worcestershire lost by an innings. His first victim was the 45-year-old Bobby Abel, then nearing the end of his long career. Wilson took 4–67 against Kent a few days later, but picked up only three more wickets in the rest of his short career.

Wilson's last match was also against Kent, in July 1906; barely a month later he was dead, aged only 32 or 33. He died in Kidderminster, Worcestershire.
