= Harry L. Wilson =

American political scientist (born 1957)

Harry L. Wilson (born 1957) is a professor of political science at Roanoke College, director of the college’s Center for Community Research, and author of the book Guns, Gun Control, and Elections: The Politics and Policy of Firearms.

== Early life and education ==
Wilson graduated from Pennsylvania State University in 1978 with a bachelor's degree in journalism, earned a master's degree in political science from Penn State University in 1983, and a doctorate in political science in 1988 from Rutgers University. He was employed as a bartender during college.

== Career ==
His book, Guns, Gun Control, and Elections explains how current gun control policy was adopted by discussing the roles and interactions of elected officials, interest groups, political parties, and the citizens.

Wilson devotes a chapter of the book specifically to gun policy in the Commonwealth of Virginia. A sabbatical in 2003 provided Wilson the time to attend several Virginia General Assembly sessions where he interviewed legislators and lobbyists. According to Wilson, because of Virginia’s proximity to the nation’s capital and the diversity of its citizens, and because it is home to the National Rifle Association of America, the state is in a position to influence national gun control policy.

WSKG-FM, an affiliate of NPR, interviewed Wilson in 2017 to look at various perspectives of the gun control issue.

== Awards ==
Wilson received a Fulbright Lecturing Award to Russia in 1995.

== Books ==
He has written three books about gun control, including: Gun Politics in America: Historical and Modern Documents in Context, released in 2016 by ABC-CLIO; The Triumph of the Gun-Rights Argument: Why the Gun Control Debate Is Over, released in 2015 by Praeger Publishing 2015; and Guns, Gun Control, and Elections: The Politics and Policy of Firearms, released from Rowman & Littlefield Publishing in 2007.
