= Harry Wilson (footballer, born 1897) =

English footballer

Personal information
- Full name: Henry Wilson
- Date of birth: 3 May 1897
- Place of birth: Marsden, Tyne and Wear, England
- Position: Wing half

Senior career*
Years	Team	Apps	(Gls)
1918–1919	Marsden Rescue		
1919–1928	South Shields	221	(19)
1928–1931	Blackpool	32	(1)
1931	Aldershot		
Total		253	(20)
- * Club domestic league appearances and goals

Henry Wilson (3 May 1897–unknown) was an English footballer who played in the Football League for Blackpool and South Shields.
