= Harry Willson =

American progressive author (1932–2010)

Harry Willson (23 July 1932 – 9 March 2010) was a writer of fiction, satire, social commentary, and philosophy, and co-founder of Amador Publishers in Albuquerque, New Mexico.

Willson was born in Montoursville, Pennsylvania. He attended Lafayette College in Easton, Pennsylvania, and received a B.A. in chemistry and mathematics. He received a master's of divinity at Princeton Theological Seminary and studied Spanish at University of Madrid. He moved to New Mexico in 1958 with his wife and three children, and he served as Spanish-speaking Presbyterian missionary for eight years. Willson's views toward the church slowly changed, and he left the ministry in 1966. He became a teacher of history, English, and philosophy at Albuquerque Academy from 1966 to 1973 and at Sandia Prep from 1973 to 1976.

For the next ten years, Willson wrote books and worked different jobs, including owning a worm ranch, selling produce from an organic garden, selling fireplace heater-inserts, and helping his wife open a drapery business. In 1986, he founded Amador Publishers with his wife, Adela Amador, and in 2006, Willson and Amador changed Amador Publishers to Amador Publishers, LLC, with Zelda Gordon as co-owner and managing editor. Amador Publishers, LLC, has published more than thirty titles from more than fifteen authors, including Gene H. Bell-Villada, Donald Gutierrez, and Eva Krutein. Willson believed his authors emphasized themes he valued, peace, ecology, harmony, and feminism.

== Works ==
- From Fear to Love: My Journey Beyond Christianity; 2012; Amador Publishers, LLC; ISBN 978-0-938513-42-1
- Myth and Mortality: A Humanist Tests the Stories; 2007; Amador Publishers, LLC; ISBN 978-0-938513-39-1
- Freedom from God: Restoring the Sense of Wonder; 2002; Amador Publishers, LLC; ISBN 978-0-938513-33-9
- Vermin and Other Survival Stories: Humanity as an Endangered Species; 1996; Amador Publishers, LLC; ISBN 978-0-938513-22-3
- A World for the Meek; 1987; Amador Publishers, LLC; ISBN 978-0-938513-01-8
- Souls and Cells Remember; 1987; Amador Publishers, LLC; ISBN 978-0-938513-03-2
- Duke City Tales: Stories from Albuquerque; 1986; Amador Publishers, LLC; ISBN 978-0-938513-00-1
- This'll Kill Ya and Other Dangerous Stories: The Last Word on Censorship; 1991; III Publishing; ISBN 978-0962293726
- Christmas Blues: Behind the Holiday Mask: An Anthology; 1995; Amador Publishers, LLC; ISBN 978-0-938513-18-6
