= Harry Wilson (Northamptonshire cricketer) =

English cricketer

Harry Wilson was a first-class cricketer who played one match for Northamptonshire County Cricket Club in 1931.

His career was short but unique in that he may be the unluckiest batsman in the history of the game. Selected to appear against the touring New Zealand team, he was run out twice in the match, without facing a ball, and never picked again. He found more luck with the ball, taking the wicket of Curly Page at a cost of 45 with his right arm medium pace.

Born in 1897, he died on 25 April 1960 in Peterborough, the town in which his only first-class game was played.
