= Harry Zakour =

Lebanese-Ghanaian businessman (born 1949)

- Born: January 15, 1949 (age 77); Accra
- Occupations: Businessman, football administrator, politician

Harry Zakour (born 15 January 1949 in Accra) is a Lebanese–Ghanaian businessman, politician, and former association football administrator.

== Early life and business career ==
Harry Zakour was born on 15 January 1949 in Accra, in the Jamestown area. Of Lebanese and Ghanaian heritage, he became a prominent businessman in Ghana, with interests in the hospitality and media sectors. He is known to own the Bus Stop Restaurant in Accra, which contributed to his public profile prior to his rise in football administration and politics.

== Football administration ==
=== Accra Hearts of Oak ===
Zakour is best known for his role as chief executive officer of Accra Hearts of Oak, one of Ghana's most successful football clubs. During his tenure, the club achieved one of the most successful seasons in African club football history. In the year 2000, Hearts of Oak won the Ghana Premier League, the Ghana FA Cup, the CAF Champions League, and the CAF Super Cup.

Zakour has publicly discussed the financial and personal sacrifices he made during his time at Hearts of Oak, including claims that he personally funded club operations at certain times, leading to family tensions.

Following his departure from the club, Zakour has been openly critical of subsequent leadership and has spoken about a long-standing strained relationship with former majority shareholder and board chairman Togbe Afede XIV, citing differences in vision and governance.

== Political involvement ==
Zakour is a long-standing member of the National Democratic Congress (NDC). He served as Second Vice Chairman of the party in 2016 and was previously elected Chairman of the Korley Klottey Constituency in Accra in 2009.

== Media interests ==
Zakour is the owner of the transmitting frequency of Montie FM, a Ghanaian radio station known for political programming. The station became nationally prominent following its involvement in a high-profile contempt of court case relating to comments made about the Supreme Court of Ghana in 2016.
