= Harry Waller (footballer, born 1917) =

English footballer

Personal information
- Full name: Henry Harold Waller
- Date of birth: 20 August 1917
- Place of birth: Ashington, England
- Date of death: April 1984 (aged 66)
- Place of death: Ashington, England
- Position: Wing half

Senior career*
Years	Team	Apps	(Gls)
- Ashington
1937–1947	Arsenal	8	(0)
1937–1938	→ Margate (loan)		
1947–1948	Leyton Orient	17	(0)
- Ashington
Total		25	(0)
- * Club domestic league appearances and goals

Henry Harold Waller (20 August 1917 – April 1984) was an English professional footballer who played as a wing half.

== Career ==
Waller began his career in non-league football with Ashington, signing for Arsenal in October 1937. He initially spent time with Arsenal's nursery club Margate, returning to Arsenal in May 1938. Due to the outbreak of World War II, Waller's competitive appearances were limited. He served in the British Army in Sicily and Italy. During the war, he featured in the 1941 London War Cup against Millwall. His official first team debut was against Blackburn Rovers on 4 September 1946. He made eight appearances in the Football League for Arsenal during the 1946–47 season before being transferred to Leyton Orient in July 1947.

Waller made 17 league appearances for Leyton Orient, before returning to Ashington.
