= Harry Walters (photographer) =

English photographer (1848–1926)

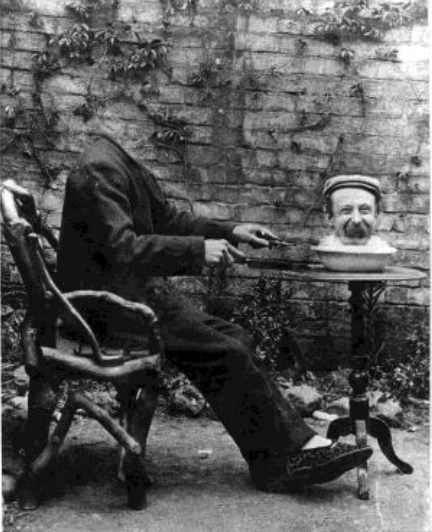
Trick self portrait of Harry Walters eating his own head

Harry Walters (1848, Uckfield – 1926) was a prominent photographer in late Victorian and Edwardian Ipswich.

Walters first worked as a cook and confectioner. But he built his first camera in 1870 and established himself as a professional photographer by 1894. Originally based in Crown Street, Ipswich, he established his business at 11 St Margarets Plain, Ipswich in 1906, where it remained until his death in 1926. He lived here with his wife and five children. In addition to producing thousands of studio portraits, he also recorded local events, many of which were reproduced as postcards.

He used the stage name "Harry Wilmott" appearing with a group of musicians known as the Snowflake Minstrels.

Walters enjoyed producing trick photographs, including one featuring HMS Hannibal blended into a scene on Ipswich New Cut, in Ipswich dock. The photograph was used on a postcard circa 1896.

== Gallery ==
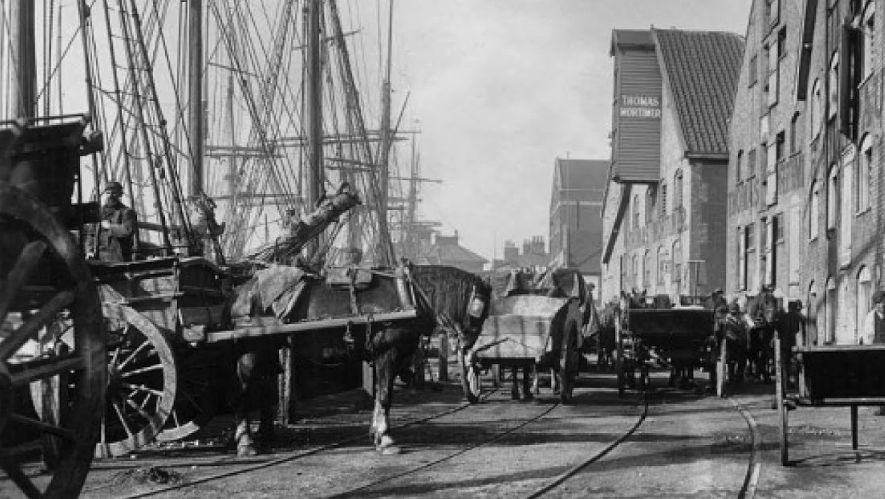
Neptune Quay

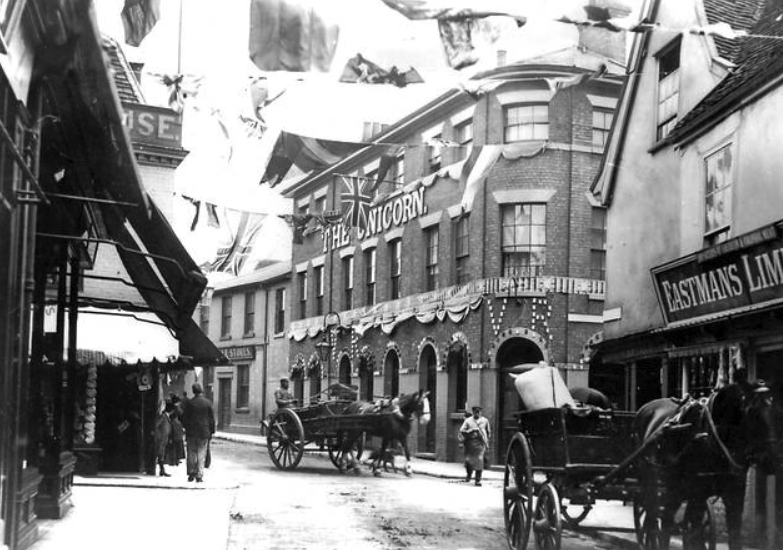
Unicorn Hotel, Tacket Street

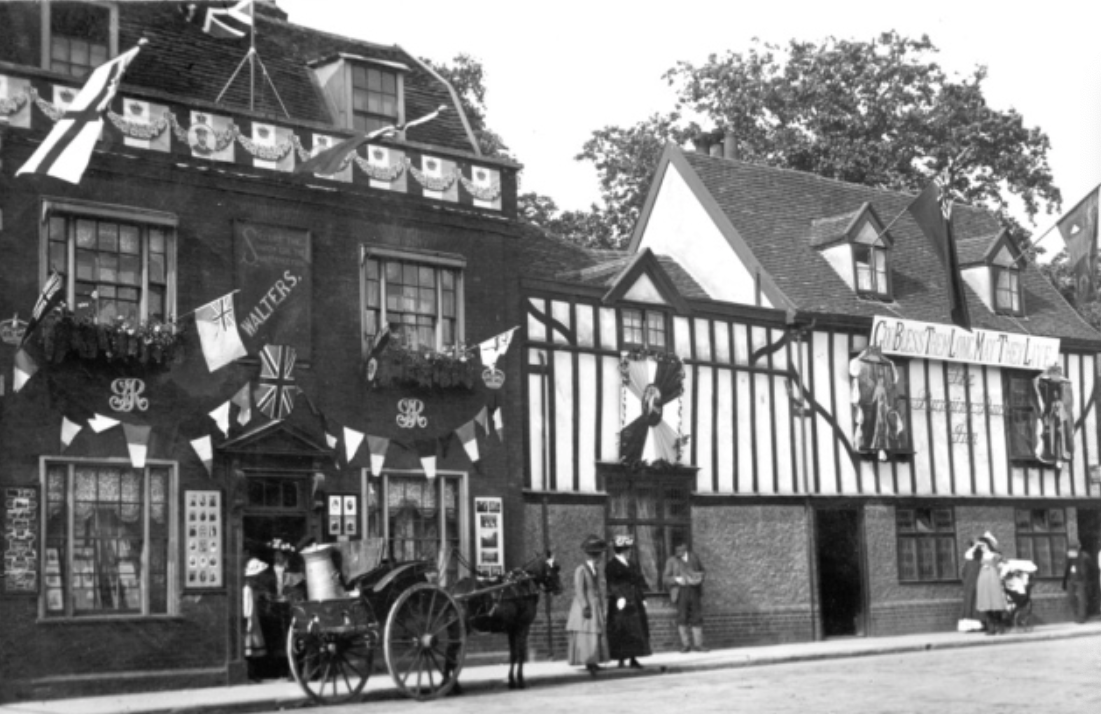
Harry Walters shop decorated to celebrate the coronation of King George V in 1911
