= Harry Wall (politician) =

American politician

Member of the Washington State Senate
- In office 1941–1949
- In office 1953 – November 9, 1955

Personal details
- Born: November 12, 1893 Marinette, Wisconsin, US
- Died: November 9, 1955 (aged 61) Chelan County, Washington, US
- Party: Republican
- Profession: Lumberjacker

Harry Wall was an American politician. He was a member of the Washington State Senate.

== Biography ==
Wall was born in Marinette, Wisconsin on November 12, 1893. He would become a lumberjack.

== Political career ==
Wall was a member of the state senate from 1941 to 1949, and again from 1953 to his death in 1955. He was a delegate to the 1948 Republican National Convention.
