= Harry Wilson (footballer, born 1896) =

Association footballer

Personal information
- Full name: Henry Wilson
- Date of birth: 1896
- Place of birth: Belfast, Ireland
- Position: Winger

Senior career*
Years	Team	Apps	(Gls)
1910–1913	Distillery		
1913–1919	Belfast Celtic		
1919	Dunmurry		
1919	Glenavon		
1920–1921	Hull City	30	(2)
1921–1922	Charlton Athletic	24	(1)
1922–1923	Aberaman Athletic		
1923–1925	Linfield		
1925	Larne		
Total		54	(3)
- * Club domestic league appearances and goals

Henry Wilson (1896–unknown) was an Irish footballer who played in the Football League for Charlton Athletic and Hull City.
