= List of people buried in Brookwood Cemetery =

The following is a list of notable burials at Brookwood Cemetery near Woking in Surrey.

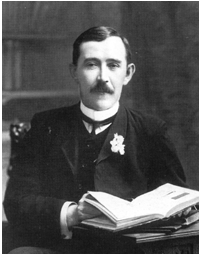
Alexis Theodorovich Aladin

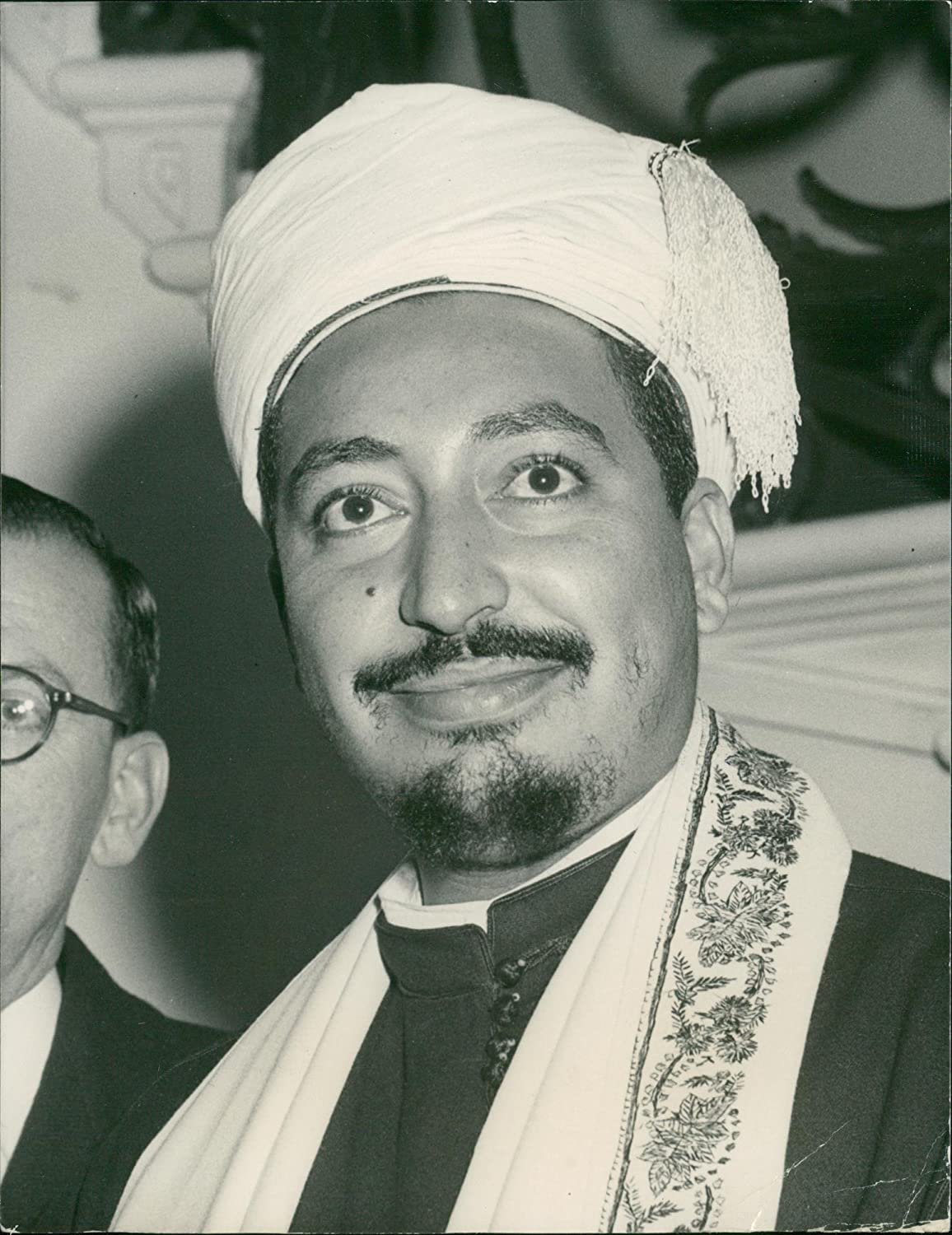
Muhammad al-Badr

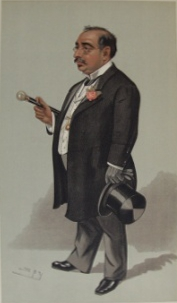
Mancherjee Bhownagree in a Vanity Fair caricature

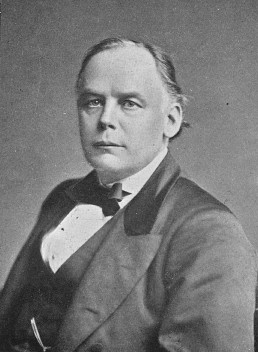
Charles Bradlaugh

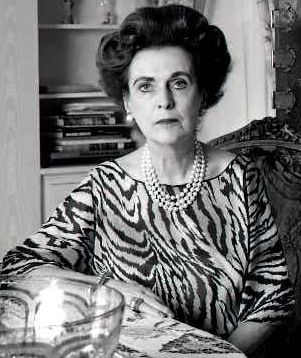
Margaret Campbell, Duchess of Argyll

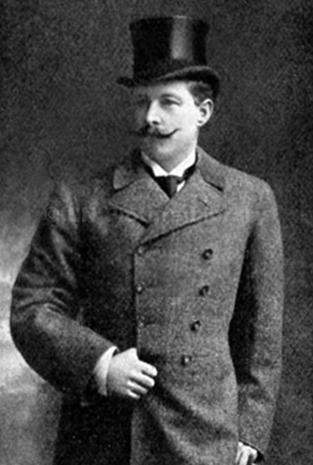
Cosmo Duff-Gordon

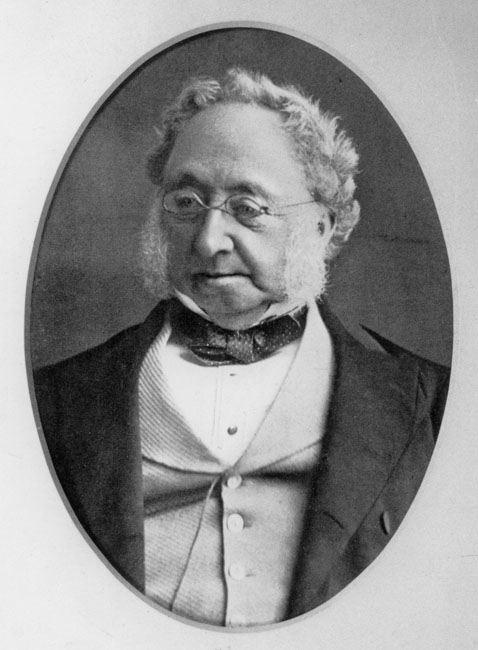
Thomas Hawksley

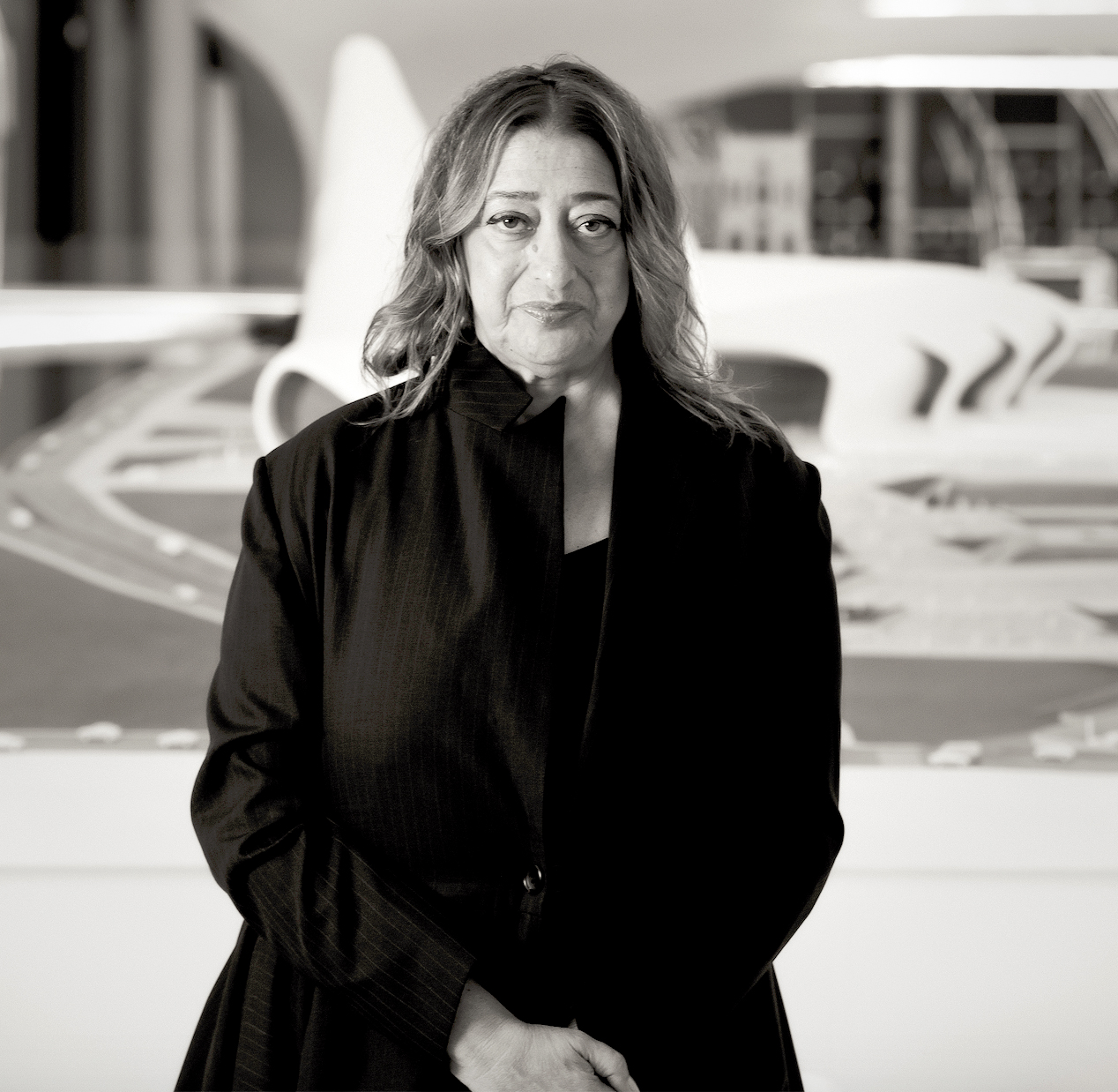
Zaha Hadid

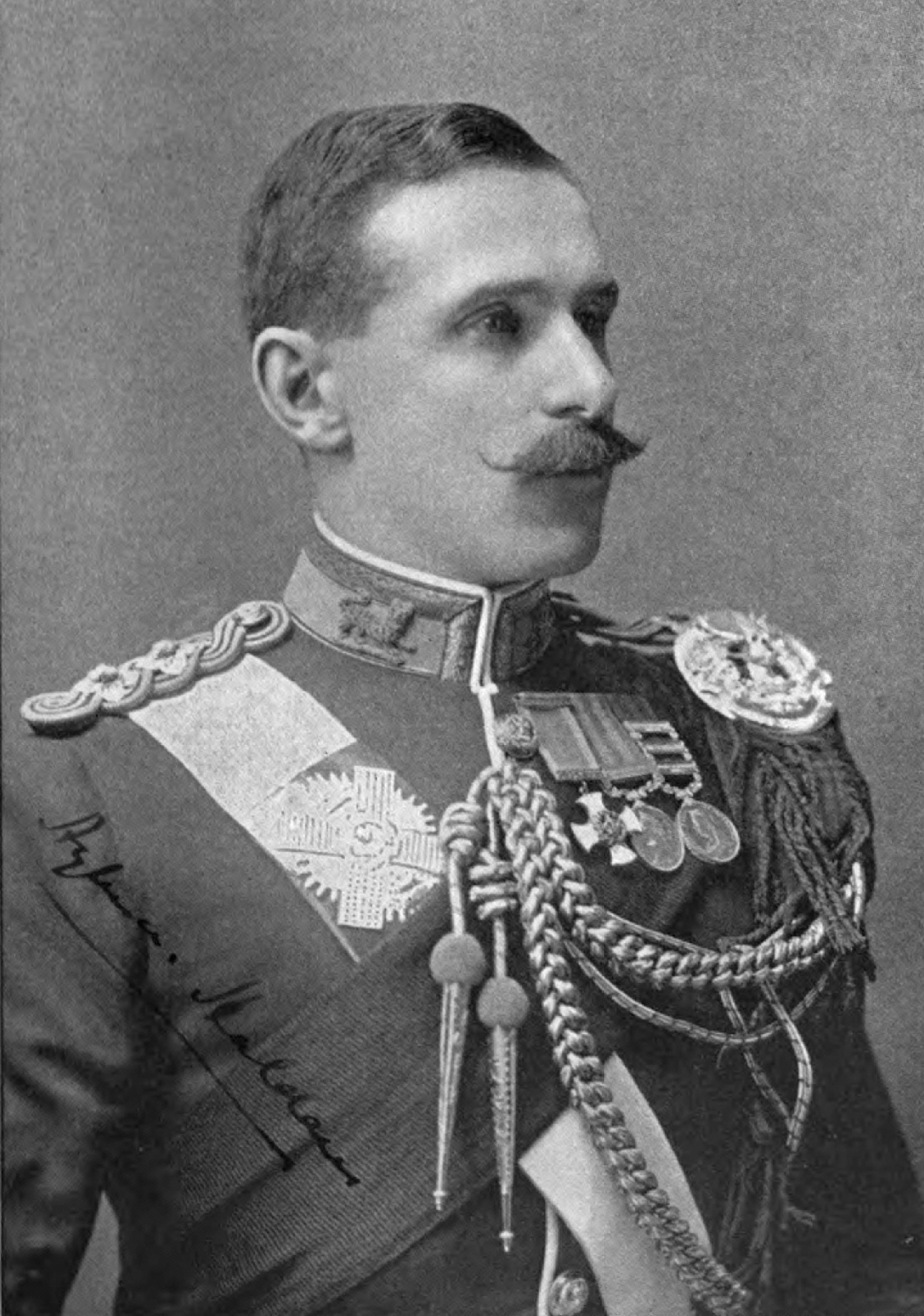
Aylmer Haldane

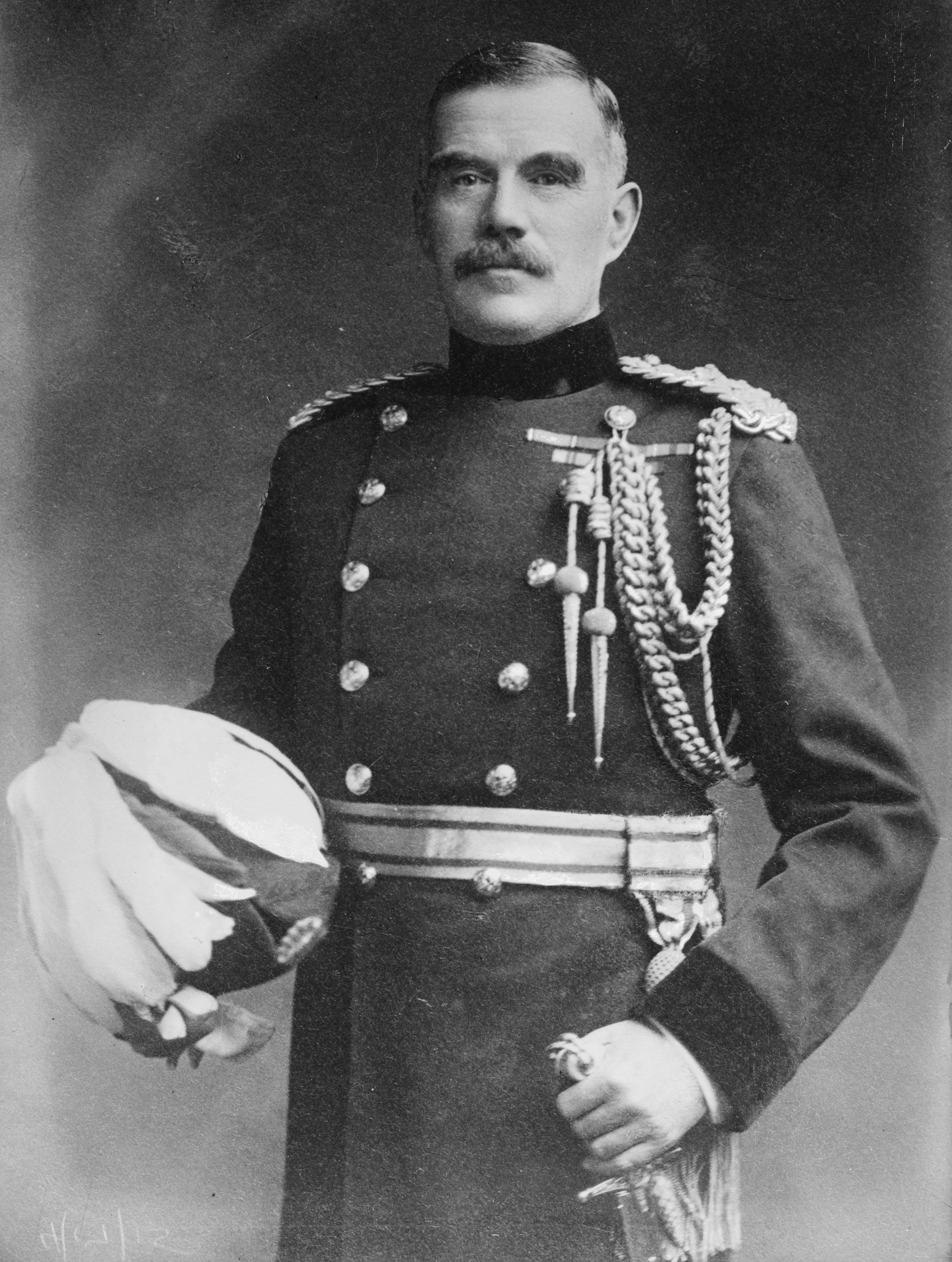
Sir William Robertson

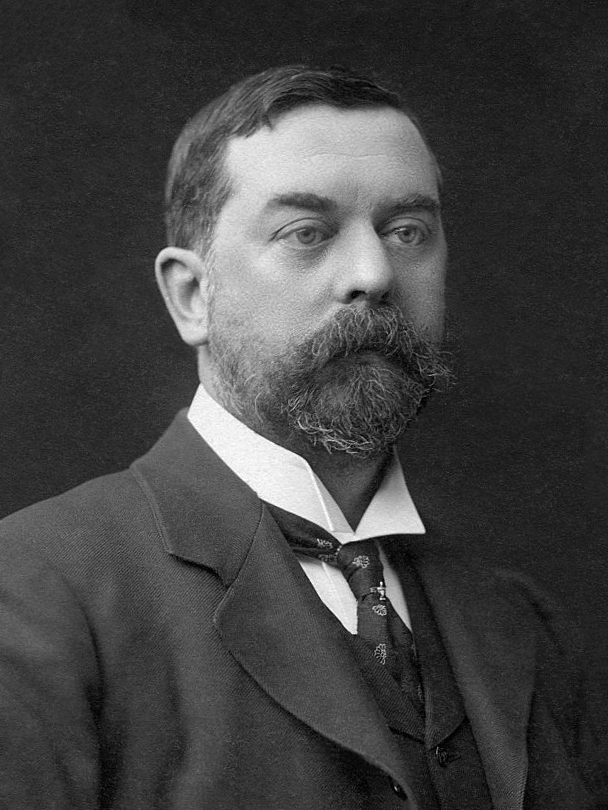
John Singer Sargent

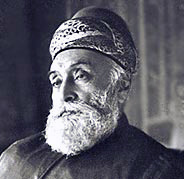
Jamshedji Tata

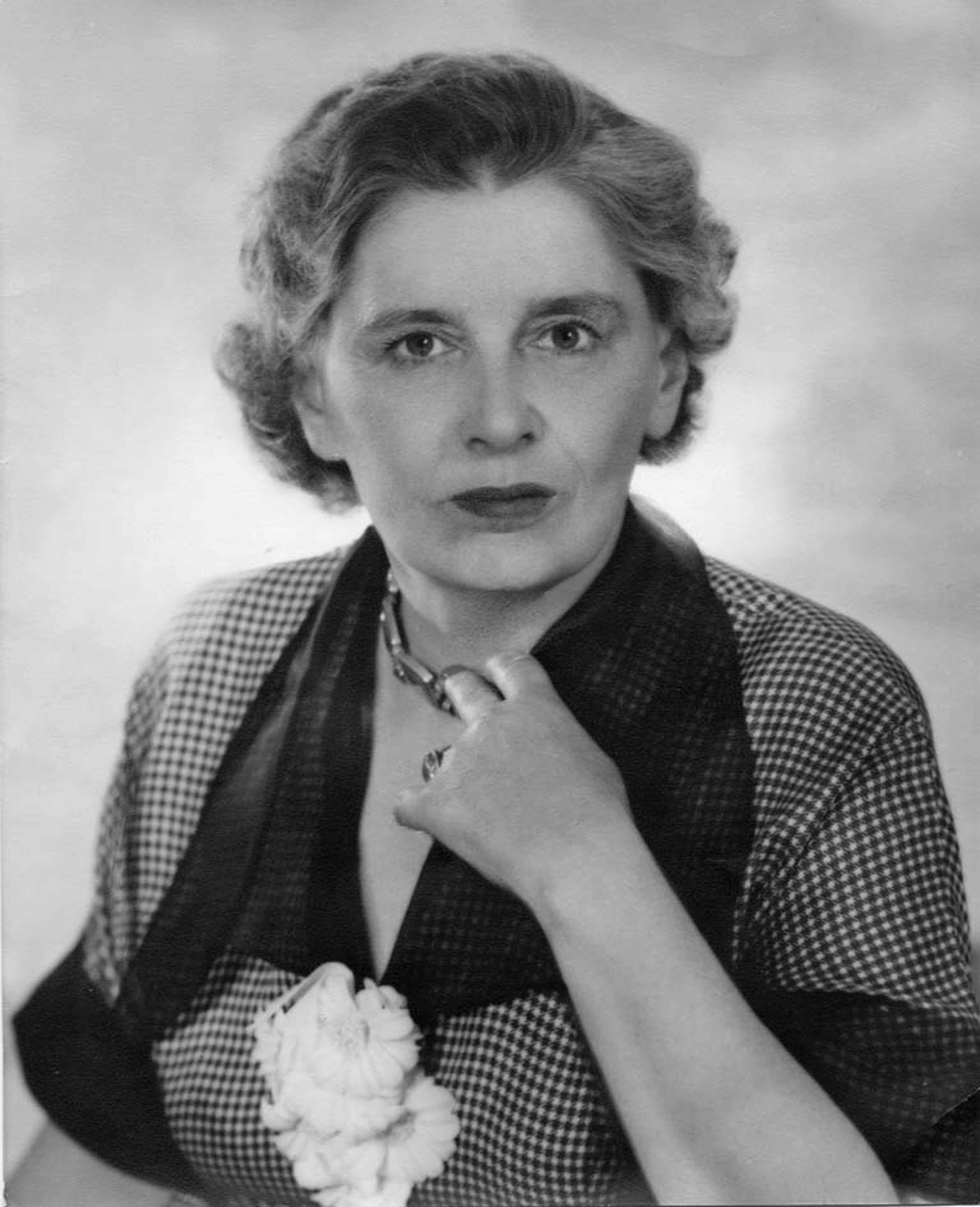
Rebecca West

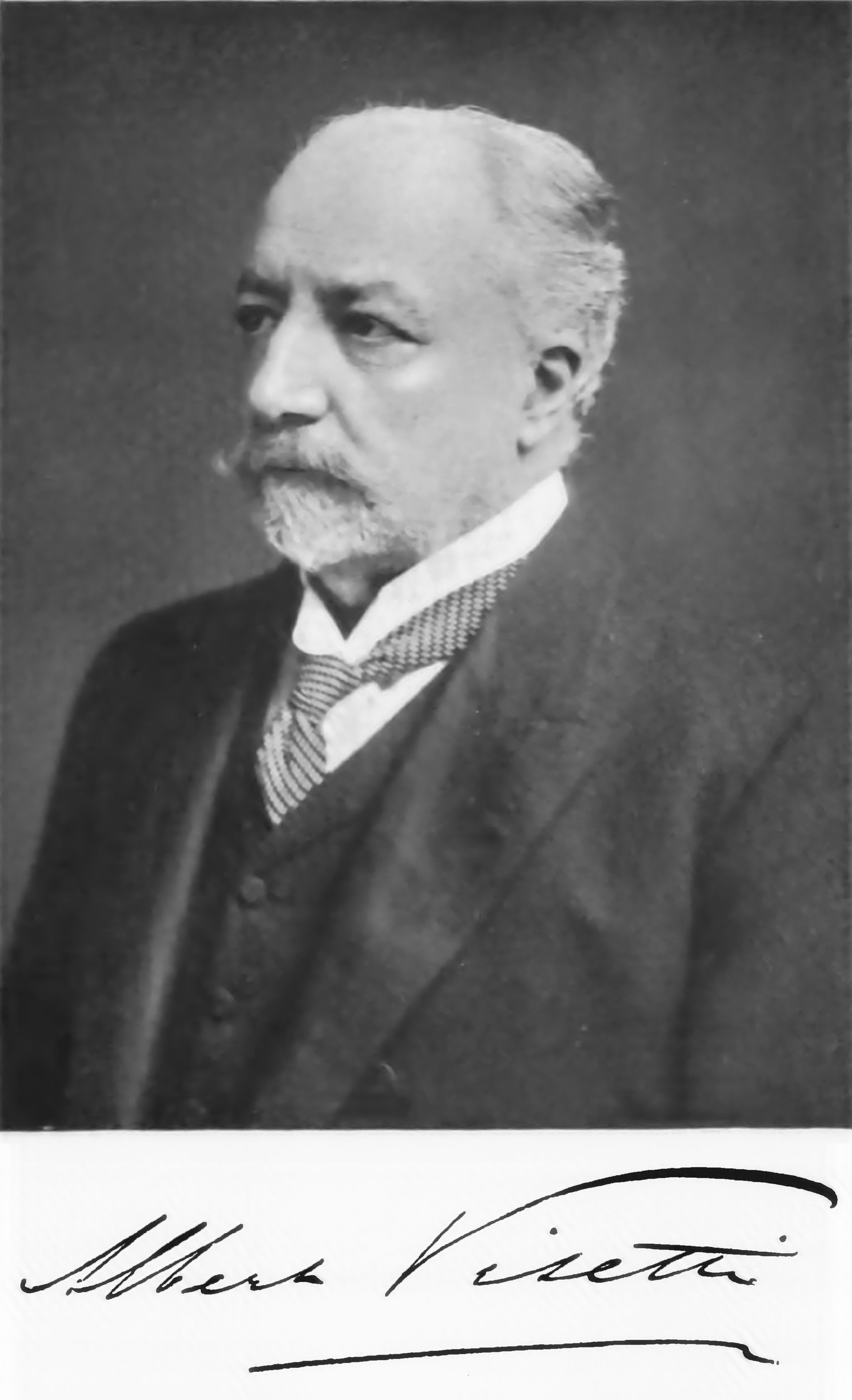
Albert Visetti

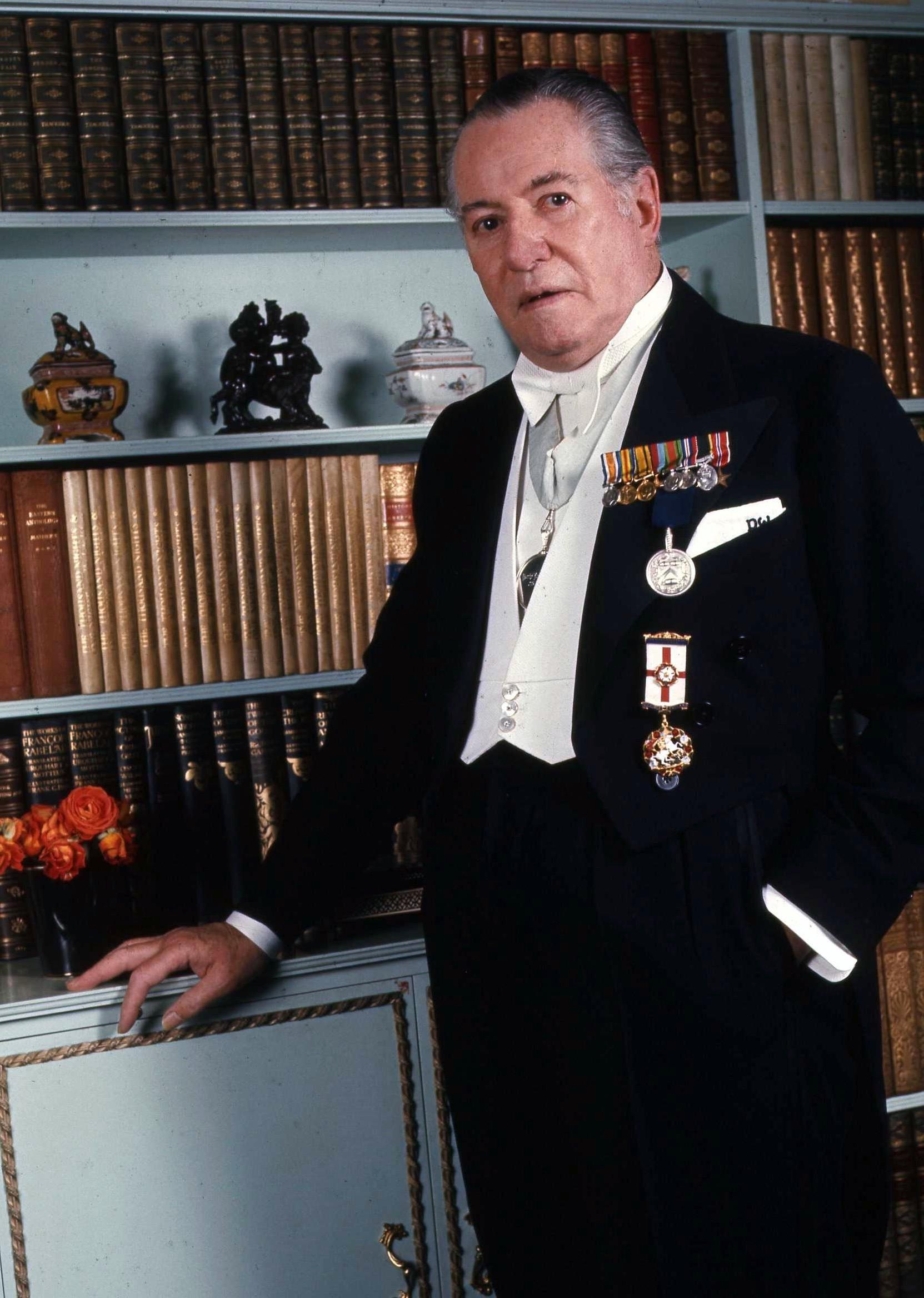
Dennis Wheatley

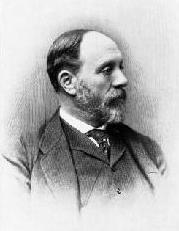
John Wolfe Barry

- William Addison (VC)
- Alexis Theodorovich Aladin
- Omar Ali-Shah
- Abdullah Yusuf Ali
- Aftab Ali
- Naji al-Ali
- Syed Ameer Ali
- Abdul Rahman Andak
- Richard Ansdell
- Margaret Campbell, Duchess of Argyll
- Muhammad al-Badr
- Robert Nisbet Bain
- Daniel Marcus William Beak
- Dudley Beaumont
- John Hay Beith
- Boris Berezovsky (businessman)
- Mancherjee Bhownagree
- Charles Bradlaugh
- Benjamin Thomas Brandreth-Gibbs
- Harold Brown
- Robert Ashington Bullen
- Bennet Burleigh
- Llewellyn Cadwaladr
- Frederic Chase
- Sir James Charles Chatterton, 3rd Baronet
- Styllou Christofi
- Willy Clarkson
- Marcel Clech
- Lord Edward Clinton
- Edward Compton
- Richard Congreve
- Admiral Robert Coote
- Alexander Angus Croll
- Arthur Cumming (Royal Navy officer)
- Dadiba Merwanji Dalal
- Evelyn De Morgan
- John Eugène, 8th Count de Salis-Soglio
- William De Morgan
- Dugald Drummond
- John Lowther du Plat Taylor
- Cosmo Duff-Gordon
- Fortunatus Dwarris
- Gai Eaton
- Charles Edmonds
- Thomas Farrer, 1st Baron Farrer
- Maurice Fitzmaurice
- William Forsyth
- Douglas Freshfield
- Cyril Frisby VC
- John Augustus Fuller
- James Galloway (physician)
- Reginald Ruggles Gates
- Eric Neville Geijer
- Carroll Gibbons
- Charles Tyrrell Giles
- Henry Goldfinch
- Robert Freke Gould
- Ramadan Güney
- Foulath Hadid
- Mohammed Hadid
- Zaha Hadid
- William Henry Hadow
- Aylmer Haldane
- Sir Archibald Hamilton, 5th Baronet
- Dudley Hardy
- Edmund Hartley VC
- Thomas Hawksley
- Rowland Allanson-Winn, 5th Baron Headley
- Henry Heath
- Christopher Hewett, actor best known for his role of the title character on Mr. Belvedere
- Frank Hoar
- James Hollowell VC
- Emma Hosken
- Thomas Humphrey
- Alfred William Hunt
- Violet Hunt
- Edgar Inkson VC
- Rebecca Isaacs
- Samuel Swinton Jacob
- Jeejeebhoy Piroshaw Bomanjee Jeejeebhoy
- Samuel Johnson (comedian)
- William Kenny (VC)
- Johanna Kinkel
- Robert Knox
- Lady Henry Somerset
- Gottlieb Wilhelm Leitner
- Mechtilde von Lichnowsky
- Dugald McTavish Lumsden
- John Lynch (Fenian)
- Alexander Mackonochie
- Mahmoud Kahil
- Mary Horner Lyell
- Louis Mallet
- Andrew Mamedoff
- Thomas Manders
- Ross Mangles VC
- John Charles Oakes Marriott
- Sir Henry Berkeley Fitzhardinge Maxse
- Buck McNair
- Homi Maneck Mehta
- Maury Meiklejohn
- Hamid Mirza
- Ernest William Moir
- Margaret, Lady Moir
- Francis David Morice
- Daniel Nicols
- Sir Michael O'Dwyer
- John Humffreys Parry
- General Sir Robert Phayre
- Marmaduke Pickthall
- Zdeňka Pokorná
- Abdullah Quilliam
- Margaret Raine Hunt
- Sir Henry Rawlinson, 1st Baronet
- William Reynolds (VC)
- Sir William Robertson, 1st Baronet
- William Stewart Ross
- Said bin Taimur
- Shapurji Saklatvala
- Nowroji Saklatwala
- John Singer Sargent
- Edward Saunders
- Shelley Scarlett
- Harry Seeley
- Idries Shah
- Ikbal Ali Shah
- Saira Elizabeth Luiza Shah
- John Sherwood-Kelly VC
- Daniel Solander
- Fred Spofforth
- Newton John Stabb
- Jane Stephens (actress)
- Marie Spartali Stillman
- William James Stillman
- John Proudfoot Stratton
- James T. Tanner
- Dorabji Tata
- Jamsetji Tata
- Ratanji Tata
- Eustace Tennyson d'Eyncourt
- Edith Thompson - removed to the City of London Cemetery in 2018
- Edward Maunde Thompson
- John Tiller
- Montagu Towneley-Bertie
- J. H. A. Tremenheere
- Thomas Twisden Hodges
- Joe Vandeleur
- Douglas Vickers
- Albert Visetti
- Charles Warne
- David Waterlow
- Rebecca West
- Dennis Wheatley
- John Wolfe Barry
- Henry Saint Clair Wilkins
- Adolphus Williamson
- Bernhard Wise
- Bernard Barham Woodward
- Wallace Duffield Wright
- John Wrightson
- F. F. E. Yeo-Thomas

== Aircraft accident section ==
There are a number of graves of groups of people killed in aircraft accidents.

- 1959 Transair Douglas Dakota accident
- Iberia Flight 062
- 1967 Air Ferry DC-4 accident
- Elvetham air crash (in the Czechoslovak section of the military cemetery)
