= Henry Woodward (geologist) =

English geologist and paleontologist

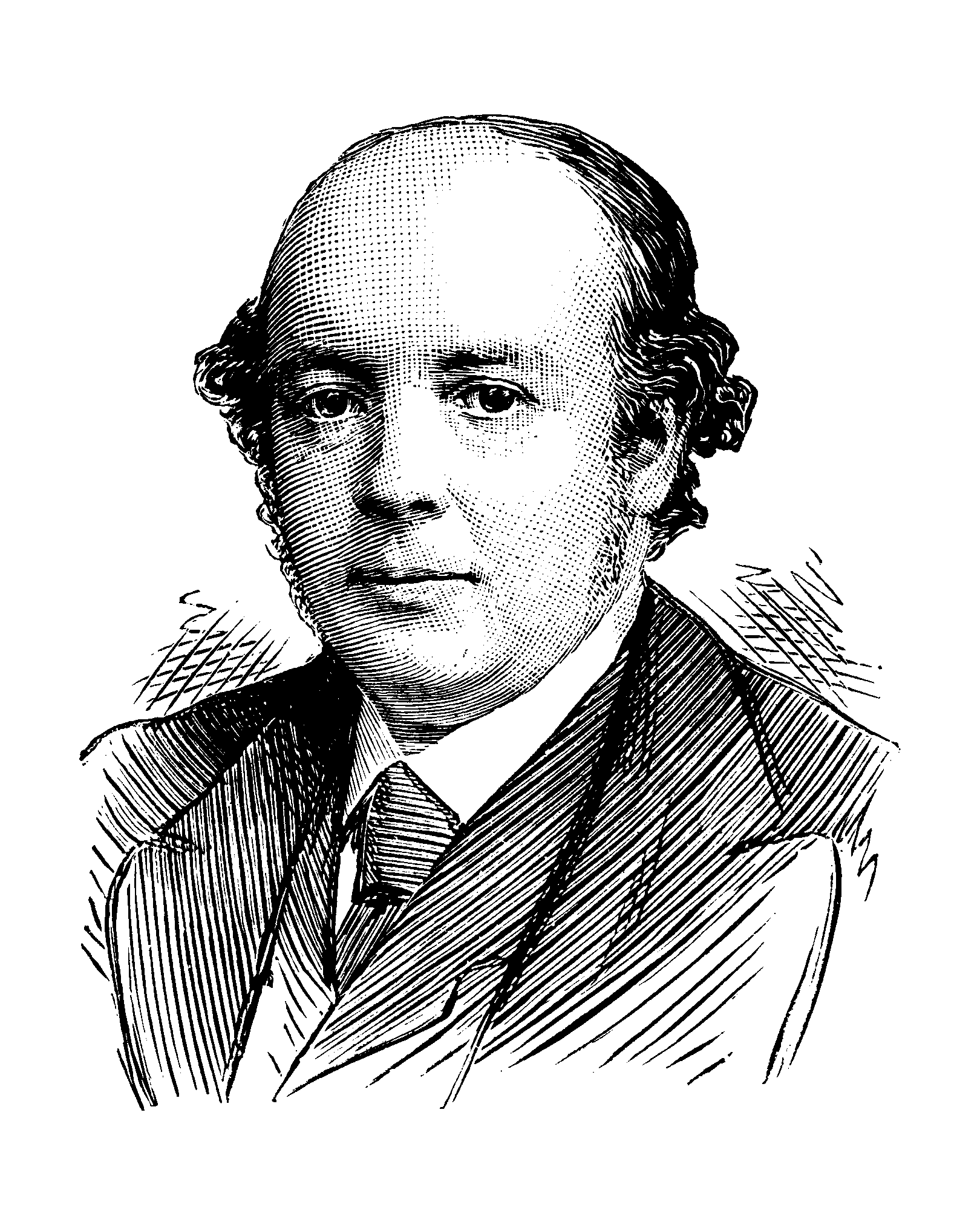
- Born: 24 November 1832; Norwich, England
- Died: 6 September 1921 (aged 88); Bushey, England
- Known for: Invertebrate paleontology
- Children: Henry P. Woodward; Martin F. Woodward; Alice B. Woodward; Gertrude M. Woodward
- Awards: Murchison Medal; Wollaston Medal
- Scientific career
- Fields: Geology, Paleontology
- Institutions: British Museum of Natural History

Henry Bolingbroke Woodward (24 November 1832 – 6 September 1921) was an English geologist and paleontologist known for his research on fossil crustaceans and other arthropods.

Woodward was born Norwich, England on 24 November 1832 and was educated at Norwich School.

He became assistant in the geological department of the British Museum in 1858, and in 1880 keeper of that department. He became Fellow of the Royal Society in 1873, LL.D (St Andrews) in 1878, president of the Geological Society of London (1894–1896). He was awarded the Murchison Medal in 1884 and Wollaston Medal in 1906. Woodward was president of the Geologists' Association for the years 1873 and 1874, president of the Malacological Society in 1893–1895, president of the Museums Association for the year 1900, and president of the Palaeontographical Society from 1895 (upon the death of incumbent president T. H. Huxley) to his own death in 1921.

He published a Monograph of the British Fossil Crustacea, Order Merostomata (Palaeontograph. Soc. 1866–1878); A Monograph of Carboniferous Trilobites (Pal. Soc. 1883–1884), and many articles in scientific journals. He was editor of the Geological Magazine from its commencement in 1864 and sole editor from July 1865 until the end of 1918. Woodward's collection of shells, manuscripts and casts of fossil vertebrates can be found in the archives of the Cambridge University Museum of Zoology.

== Family ==
Henry's father, Samuel Woodward, was a noted geologist and antiquary. Henry's brother Bernard Bolingbroke Woodward became a noted librarian and antiquary while his brother Samuel Pickworth Woodward became a professor of geology and natural history. His nephews were Bernard Barham Woodward, a British malacologist and a member of staff at the British Museum and the Natural History Museum and Horace Bolingbroke Woodward, who was vice-president of the Geological Society and a Fellow of the Royal Society.

Henry Woodward had two sons, both of whom died before he did; the eldest, Henry Page Woodward was also a noted geologist who worked in Australia. Henry's second son, Martin, was a student of T. H. Huxley alongside H. G. Wells. He was a promising zoologist, but was lost at sea when the boat in which he was traveling capsized in Ballinakill harbour. Henry also had five daughters, two of whom—Alice B. Woodward and Gertrude Mary Woodward—worked in biological illustration, although Alice was primarily known for her children's book illustrations.
