= B. B. Woodward =

B. B. Woodward may refer to:

- Bernard Barham Woodward (1853–1930), British malacologist with the British Museum and Natural History Museum, London
- Bernard Bolingbroke Woodward (1816–1869), uncle to the above, British antiquarian and Royal Librarian at Windsor Castle
