= Timeline of Leiden =

The following is a timeline of the history of the municipality of Leiden, Netherlands.

== Prior to 20th century ==
- 11th C. - Burcht van Leiden (an old shell keep).
- 1323 - School active (approximate date).
- 1377 - Hooglandse Kerk (church) construction begins.
- 1390
  - Public clock installed (approximate date).
  - Pieterskerk (church) construction begins.
- 1420 - Leiden#Siege of 1420 Siege of 1420.
- 1483 - Printing press in operation.
- 1520 - Roman ruin Brittenburg discovered near Leiden.
- 1566 - August: Iconoclasm by Protestants.
- 1572 - Protestant sermonizing begins at the Vrouwekerk.
- 1573 - Siege of Leiden by Spanish forces begins.
- 1574 - 3 October: Siege of Leiden ends.
- 1575
  - Leiden University founded.
  - Leiden University Library founded.
- 1577 - Flemish textile manufacturers move to Leiden.
- 1578 - Gemeenlandshuis van Rijnland (water management building) purchased.
- 1580s - "Immigration of Flemings, Walloons, and Brabanters" to Leiden.
- 1580 - Printer Elsevier in business.
- 1581 - Academy Building, Leiden in use.
- 1587 - Hortus Botanicus Leiden (garden) founded.
- 1594
  - Leiden anatomical theatre established.
  - Turkish tulips planted in the Hortus Botanicus.
- 1598 - Leiden Town Hall built.
- 1600 - Latin School, Leiden built.
- 1606 - 15 July: Birth of Rembrandt van Rijn.
- 1612 - Stads Timmerhuis built.
- 1622 - Population: 44,745.
- 1630s - Fijnschilders (artists) active.
- 1633 - Leiden Observatory established.
- 1639 - Marekerk (a Protestant church) founded.
- 1640 - Population: 100,000. (estimate)
- 1641 - Laecken-Halle (cloth hall) built.
- 1648 - Leiden Guild of Saint Luke established.
- 1655 - Bibliotheca Thysiana (library) established.
- 1658 - Weigh House built.
- 1683 - Luchtmans bookseller in business.
- 1723 - Synagogue, Leiden established.
- 1745 - Electricity-storing "Leyden jar" invented.
- 1766 - Maatschappij der Nederlandse Letterkunde and Kunst Wordt door Arbeid Verkreegen literary societies formed.
- 1800 - Population: 30,000. (estimate)
- 1807 - 12 January: Leiden Gunpowder Disaster.
- 1818 - National Museum of Antiquities established.
- 1820 - National Museum of Natural History founded.
- 1837 - National Museum of Ethnology founded.
- 1838 - Stedelijk Gymnasium Leiden (school) active.
- 1842 - Leiden Centraal railway station opened.
- 1848 - E. J. Brill publisher in business.
- 1851 - Sijthoff publisher in business.
- 1860 - Leiden Observatory re-built in the Hortus Botanicus Leiden.
- 1864 - Training college for Dutch East Indies civil servants established (later the Royal Netherlands Institute of Southeast Asian and Caribbean Studies).
- 1873 - Remonstrant seminary active.
- 1874 - Municipal Museum of Antiquities established.
- 1893 - Gemeentearchief Leiden (city archive) building constructed.

== 20th century ==
- 1904
  - Leiden Yearbook begins publication.
  - Population: 56,044.
- 1919 - Population: 61,408.
- 1923 - Jan van Houtbrug (bridge) built.
- 1925 - St. Joseph, Leiden (Roman Catholic parish church) built.
- 1928 - University Hospital built.
- 1931
  - Leidse Hout (public urban park) opened.
  - Museum Boerhaave established.
- 1940 - Town Hall rebuilt.
- 1946 - François Henri van Kinschot becomes mayor.
- 1978 - 1978 Tour de France cycling race starts from Leiden.
- 1980
  - Cees Goekoop becomes mayor.
  - Population: 103,046 municipality.
- 1984 - Leiden Bio Science Park development begins.

== 21st century ==
- 2003 - Henri Lenferink becomes mayor.
- 2006 - Leiden University Medical Center built.
- 2012 - Theater Ins Blau built.
- 2013
  - Welch Allyn branch office in business.
  - Population: 119,800 municipality.
- 2017 - Asian Library opened by Queen Máxima of the Netherlands.

== See also ==
- Leiden history
- History of Leiden
- List of mayors of Leiden
- List of rijksmonuments in Leiden
- Timelines of other municipalities in the Netherlands: Amsterdam, Breda, Delft, Eindhoven, Groningen, Haarlem, The Hague, 's-Hertogenbosch, Maastricht, Nijmegen, Rotterdam, Utrecht

== Bibliography ==
=== in English ===
Published in the 18th-19th c.

- Thomas Nugent (1749), "Leyden", The Grand Tour, vol. 1: Netherlands, London: S. Birt, hdl:2027/mdp.39015030762598
- Abraham Rees (1819), "Leyden", The Cyclopaedia, London: Longman, Hurst, Rees, Orme & Brown, hdl:2027/mdp.39015068382327
- "Leyden". Galignani's Traveller's Guide through Holland and Belgium (4th ed.). Paris: A. and W. Galignani. 1822. hdl:2027/njp.32101073846667.
- William Henry Overall, ed. (1870). "Leyden". Dictionary of Chronology. London: William Tegg. hdl:2027/uc2.ark:/13960/t9m32q949.
- B.B. Woodward; William L.R. Cates (1872). "Leyden". Encyclopaedia of Chronology. London: Longmans, Green and Co.
- "Leyden", Guide to the North of France, ... Belgium and Holland, Edinburgh: Adam and Charles Black, 1876 – via Internet Archive
- "Leiden", Handbook for Travellers in Holland and Belgium (20th ed.), London: John Murray, 1881, hdl:2027/hvd.hn2ha2 (+ 1851 ed.)

Published in the 20th-21st c.

- "Leyden". Chambers's Encyclopaedia. London. 1901. hdl:2027/uc2.ark:/13960/t7zk5ms79.
- "Leyden", Belgium and Holland (15th ed.), Leipzig: Karl Baedeker, 1910, OCLC 397759 (+ 1881 ed.)
- "Leiden" . Encyclopædia Britannica. Vol. 16 (11th ed.). 1910. p. 395.
- Benjamin Vincent (1910), "Leyden", Haydn's Dictionary of Dates (25th ed.), London: Ward, Lock & Co., hdl:2027/uc2.ark:/13960/t41r6xh8t
- Sterling A. Lament (1981). "The Vroedschap of Leiden 1550-1600: The Impact of Tradition and Change on the Governing Elite of a Dutch City". Sixteenth Century Journal. 12 (2): 15–42. doi:10.2307/2539499. JSTOR 2539499.
- C. Fasseur (1989). "Leiden and empire: University and Colonial Office 1825-1925". In Willem Otterspeer (ed.). Leiden Oriental Connections: 1850-1940. Brill. pp. 187–203. ISBN 90-04-09022-3.
- Christine Kooi (2000). "Leiden in the Late 16th Century". Liberty and Relligion: Church and State in Leiden's Reformation, 1572-1620. Brill. ISBN 90-04-11643-5.

=== in Dutch ===
- P.J. Blok. Geschiedenis eener Hollandsche stad (in Dutch). Hague: M. Nijhoff. 1910–1918
- Henri Zondervan, ed. (1919), "Leiden", Winkler Prins' Geillustreerde Encyclopaedie (in Dutch), vol. 11 (4th ed.), Amsterdam: Uitgevers-Maatschappy "Elsevier", hdl:2027/mdp.39015068347957 (province and city)
