= Etheldred Benett =

British geologist and paleontologist

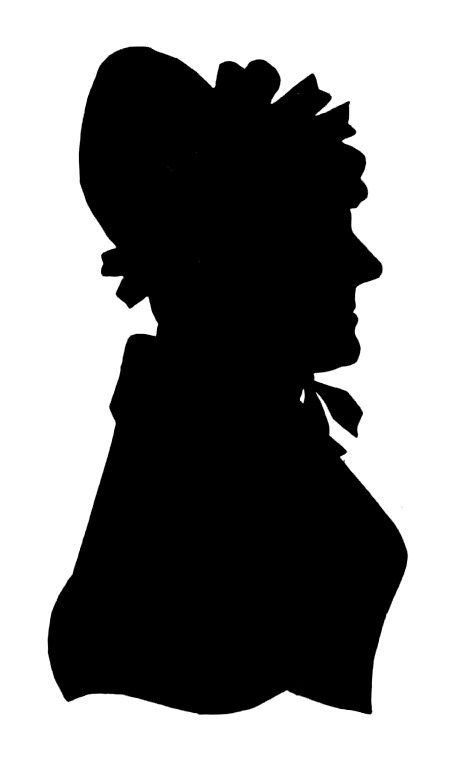
- Born: 22 July 1776; Tisbury, Wiltshire, England
- Died: 11 January 1845 (aged 68); Norton House, Norton Bavant
- Resting place: Bavant Parish Church
- Occupations: Fossil collector; geologist

Etheldred Anna Maria Benett (22 July 1776 – 11 January 1845) was an early English geologist who devoted much of her life to collecting and studying fossils that she discovered in South West England. She worked closely with many principal geologists and her fossil collection, considered one of the largest at the time, played a part in the development of geology as a field of science.

== Early life ==
Etheldred Anna Maria Benett was born in 1776 (or 1775) (Note: Sources differ on her birth year, e.g. the Oxford Dictionary of National Biography (2004) other recent sources state 1775, while H. B. Woodward's History of the Geological Society of London, Encyclopædia Britannica (1911) and more recent sources state 1776.) into a wealthy family as the second daughter of Thomas Benett (1729–1797) of Wiltshire and Catherine née Darell (d. 1790). Her maternal great-grandfather was William Wake, Archbishop of Canterbury. Her elder brother John was member of Parliament for Wiltshire and later South Wiltshire from 1819 to 1852; his daughter married Lord Charles Spencer-Churchill.

From 1802 she lived at Norton House in Norton Bavant, near Warminster, Wiltshire where she lived with her sister Anna Maria. Very little is known about Benett's home life, beyond her contributions to geology, and there is no known portrait of her, although a silhouette was published in H. B. Woodard's History of Geology (1911).

== Fossil collection ==
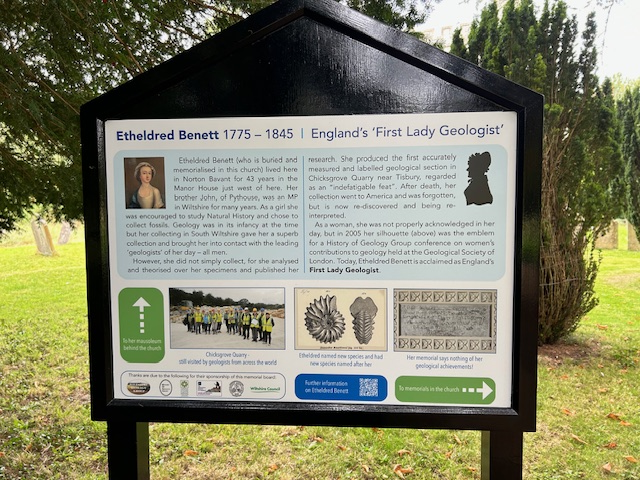
Information board commemorating 'The First Lady Geologist' in the churchyard of All Saints Parish Church, Norton Bavant

From at least 1809 until her death, she devoted herself to collecting and studying the fossils of her native county, beginning with the Warminister area. Benett was knowledgeable in stratigraphy, which aided her searches, and her wealth enabled her to hire collectors and purchase prepared specimens.

Her interest in geology was encouraged by her sister in-law's half brother, the botanist Aylmer Bourke Lambert. Lambert was an avid fossil collector who contributed to James Sowerby’s Mineral Conchology; he was a founding member of the Linnean Society, a member of the Royal Society, and an early member of the Geological Society. It was through him that Benett developed her love of fossils and relationships with many leading geologists of the time, and it is only through works by these men that most references to her work were made. For example, she contributed to Gideon Mantell's work on stratigraphy, and also worked with Sowerby. Benett was unmarried and financially independent, and so was able to dedicate much of her life to the developing field of geology through the collection and study of fossils, especially fossil sponges.

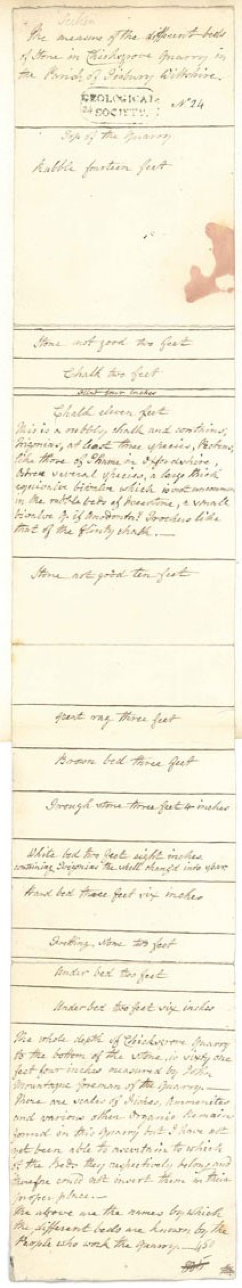
Notes on Chicksgrove Quarry, 1815

Benett's speciality was the Middle Cretaceous Upper Greensand in Wiltshire's Vale of Wardour. Her collection was one of the largest and most diverse of its time, resulting in many visitors to her home. The collection consisted of over 1500 specimens that are now being recognised due to the resurfacing of said collection by a publication in 1989. Some fossils in her collection were the first to be illustrated and described, whilst others were extremely rare or unusually well preserved.

Benett had contact with many authors of works on fossils including the Sowerbys. Forty-one of her specimens were included in Sowerby's Mineral Conchology, a major fossil reference work, in which she had the second-highest number of contributions. After viewing a part of her collection, and assuming she was male, Tsar Nicholas I granted her a Doctorate of Civil Law from the University of St. Petersburg at a time when women were not admitted into higher education institutions. The Geological Society also would not admit her as a member due to her being a woman. In response to her honorary doctorate, Benett noted that "scientific people, in general, have a very low opinion of the abilities of my sex."

After her death, the fossil collection was sold to physician Thomas Wilson of Newark, Delaware, who donated the collection to the Academy of Natural Sciences of Philadelphia .

Most of her fossil collection is currently housed at the Academy of Natural Sciences of Philadelphia after purchase by Thomas Bellerby Wilson. A few items are in British museums, in particular Leeds City Museum, and possibly in St. Petersburg. These collections contain many type specimens and some of the first fossils found with the soft tissues preserved (as recognised shortly after her death). Another particularly fascinating section of her collection was that they contained microfossils, she would have been one of the first geologists to sieve for specimens such as these, and today these are primarily used as an indication for oil deposits.

Etheldred Benett's collection contained a number of critical discoveries, for which she coined modern names and classifications. Her collection included a parcel of fossil sponges. Etheldred was the primary to call her sponges "polypothecia," and her ammonites "drepanites" (marine molluscs). She found uncommon fossil trigoniids (saltwater clams) with protected soft anatomy. These were the first of their kind to be found.

Benett's entire collection was assumed lost in the early 20th century, as specific specimens could not be located. However, the Philadelphia Academy's revived interest in early English fossil collections, and particularly Benett's collection, led to formal recognition again. This ultimately led to the discussion of her two publications, the elaboration of her taxonomic names, and the photographic illustration of many vital pieces of her collection.

Benett also took an interest in conchology and spent time collecting and detailing shells, many of which were new records. In a letter to Mantell in 1817, she claimed her shell collecting had left her with no time to look at his fossils.

Though she had a large self-acquired collection of fossils, she was also able to commission professionally sourced, cleaned, and prepared fossils to add.

== Recognition ==
Her unusual first name, one letter away from the male name Ethelred, caused many to suppose that she was a man. This mistake occurred when the Imperial Natural History Society of Moscow awarded membership to her under the name of Master Etheldredus Benett in 1836. Another example was the grant of Doctorate of Civil Law by Tsar Nicholas I; this doctorate was given to her from the University of St Petersburg at a time when women were not allowed to be accepted into higher institutions. German geologists who cited her in their works referred to her as "Miss Benett".

Bennett lived at a time when many phenomena were explained by religion, including the existence of fossils. During her lifetime, many thought fossils were the result of great catastrophes related to religion, such as Noah's flood. Furthermore, several well-known scientists were members of the clergy.

Arguably, Benett faced another disadvantage beside her gender: she lived in Wiltshire, and contributing to geology from outside London was challenging. Illness and family troubles were other obstacles that prevented her from participating in geology as fully as she might have.

She met William Smith, the "father" of English geology, and presented him with a Tisbury coral sample. He mentioned her in his letters to others, such as when he wrote about "ladies in Wiltshire" who had "distinguished themselves in their collections". Her work was recognised and appreciated by notable individuals of the time. Gideon Mantell described her as "A lady of great talent and indefatigable research," whilst the Sowerbys note her "labours in the pursuit of geological information have been as useful as they have been incessant".

Benett was chosen as the emblem for the conference "The role of women in the history of Geology" held in 2005 at the Geological Society of London.

A memorial board commemorating her achievements as 'The First Lady Geologist', is in the churchyard of All Saints' Parish Church, Norton Bavant.

== Contribution to geology and palaeontology ==
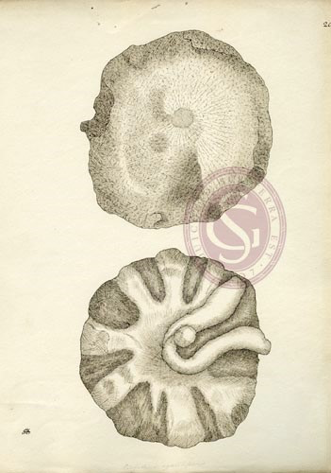
Sketches of fossil Alyconia, 1816

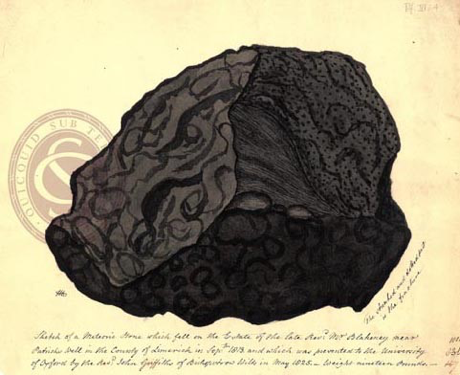
Watercolour of meteorite, 1825

Benett contributed to the early development of Wiltshire geology by corresponding extensively with fellow geologists such as George Bellas Greenough (the first president of the Geological Society), Gideon Mantell, William Buckland, and Samuel Woodward. She gave items from her fossil collection to causes such as museums, sending one to St. Petersburg. Through exchanging numerous fossils with Mantell, a thorough understanding of the Lower Cretaceous sedimentary rocks of Southern England was reached.

As expected from women at the time, Benett was mainly self-taught in the field of geology. Her financial independence allowed for her to commission an in-depth look at a stratigraphic section of the Upper Chicksgrove quarry near Tisbury in 1819, drawn to scale, although there is no scale indicated on the drawing. She called this "the measure of different beds of stone in Chicksgrove Quarry in the Parish of Tisbury". The stratigraphic section was published by naturalist James Sowerby without her knowledge. Later, through her own research she contradicted some of Sowerby's conclusions.

In 1825, her painting of the meteorite which fell on County Limerick in September 1813 was deposited in the Geological Society of London's archives, presented by Reverend John Griffiths of Bishopstrow. The meteorite is 19 pounds in weight, and the streaked and dotted part represents the fracture.

Her monograph from 1831, Catalogue of the Organic Remains of the County of Wiltshire, was published in small runs by a small printer, and not widely distributed beyond her colleagues. It is thought that she might have underestimated the value of her work.

== Later life ==
Illness during the last twenty years of Benett's life meant she spent less time collecting specimens and instead commissioned local collectors. After spending 34 years gathering what was the most extensive collection of Wiltshire fossils, Benett died at her home, Norton House, at the age of 69.

== Works ==
- A catalogue of the organic remains of the county of Wiltshire, 1831. Via Internet Archive.
- A brief enquiry into the antiquity, honour and estate of the name and family of Wake, 1833 (written by her great grandfather William Wake, Archbishop of Canterbury, but prepared for publication and footnoted by Etheldred Benett)

== See also ==
- Mary Anning
- James Hutton
- Timeline of women in science

== General and cited references ==
- Spamer, Earle E.; Bogan, Arthur E.; Torrens, Hugh S. (1989). "Recovery of the Etheldred Benett Collection of fossils mostly from Jurassic-Cretaceous strata of Wiltshire, England, analysis of the taxonomic nomenclature of Benett (1831), and notes and figures of type specimens contained in the collection". Proceedings of the Academy of Natural Sciences of Philadelphia. Vol. 141. pp. 115–180. JSTOR 4064955.
