= General Fuller =

General Fuller may refer to:

- Algernon Fuller (1885–1970), British Army major general
- Ben Hebard Fuller (1870–1937), U.S. Marine Corps major general
- Cuthbert Fuller (1874–1960), British Army major general
- Francis Fuller (British Army officer) (died 1748), British Army major general
- Horace H. Fuller (1886–1966), U.S. Army major general
- J. F. C. Fuller (1878–1966), British Army major general
- James A. Fuller (1823–1902), British Army general
- John Augustus Fuller (1828–1902), British Army general
- John W. Fuller (1827–1891), Union Army brevet major general
- Lawrence J. Fuller (1914–1998), U.S. Army major general
