= Harry Page Woodward =

British-born Australian geologist, mining engineer and public servant

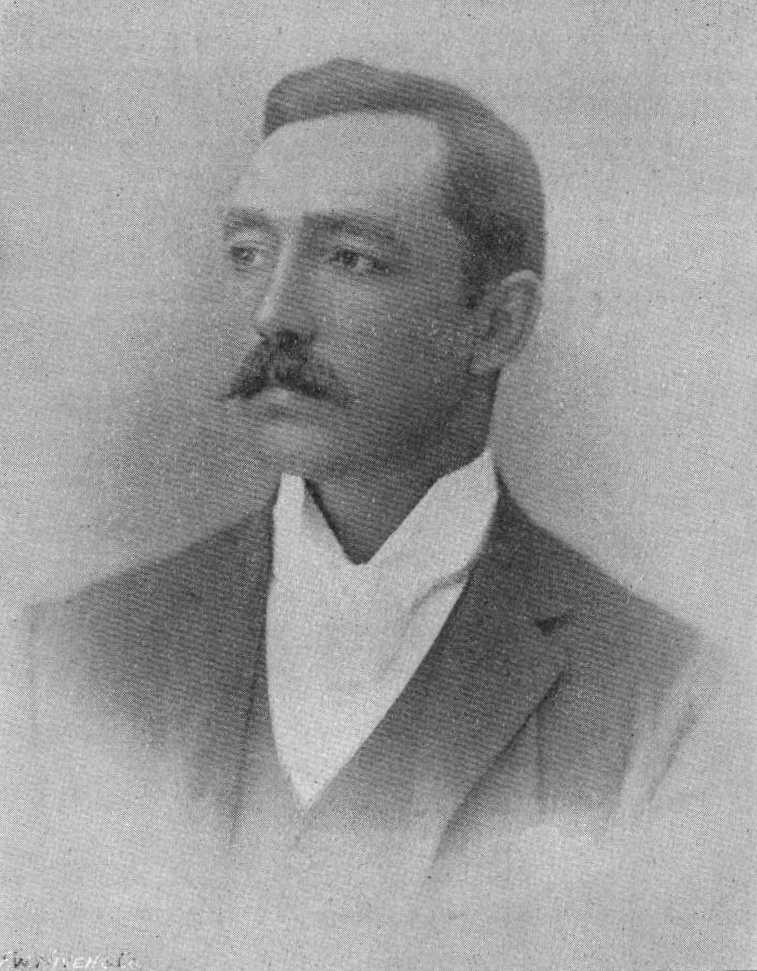
Woodward's portrait from History of West Australia

Henry Page Woodward (16 May 1858 – 8 February 1917) was a British-born Australian geologist, mining engineer and public servant. He was a fellow of the Geological Society of London, the Royal Geographical Society and the Imperial Institute, as well as a justice of the peace of the then Colony of Western Australia. Woodward was born in Norwich, Norfolk, England, the eldest son of geologist Henry Woodward, and died in West Perth, Western Australia.

In his Annual General Report of the Government Geologist, 1890 he was the first to note the potential of the Pilbara iron ore reserves:

This is essentially an iron ore country. There is enough iron ore to supply the whole world, should the present sources be worked out.

The report was ignored and it wasn't till 1961 that Lang Hancock could capitalise on his re-discovery and laws that enabled his profitable exploitation of the iron ore.

== See also ==
- Bernard Henry Woodward
- John Frederick Tasman Hassell
