= Gertrude Mary Woodward =

British scientific illustrator

Gertrude Mary Woodward (1854–1939) was a British scientific illustrator. She illustrated many palaeontological works for the Natural History Museum, London and was esteemed by her peers for the accuracy and quality of her watercolour work. She illustrated the famous Piltdown Man fossils and other works by Arthur Smith Woodward (unrelated), as well as works by zoologist Ray Lankester. She often created illustrations for the still published, earth science journal co-founded by her father, titled Geological Magazine.

Woodward was born in Camden, London, the daughter of geologist Henry Bolingbroke Woodward and sister of illustrator Alice Woodward.

== Gallery ==
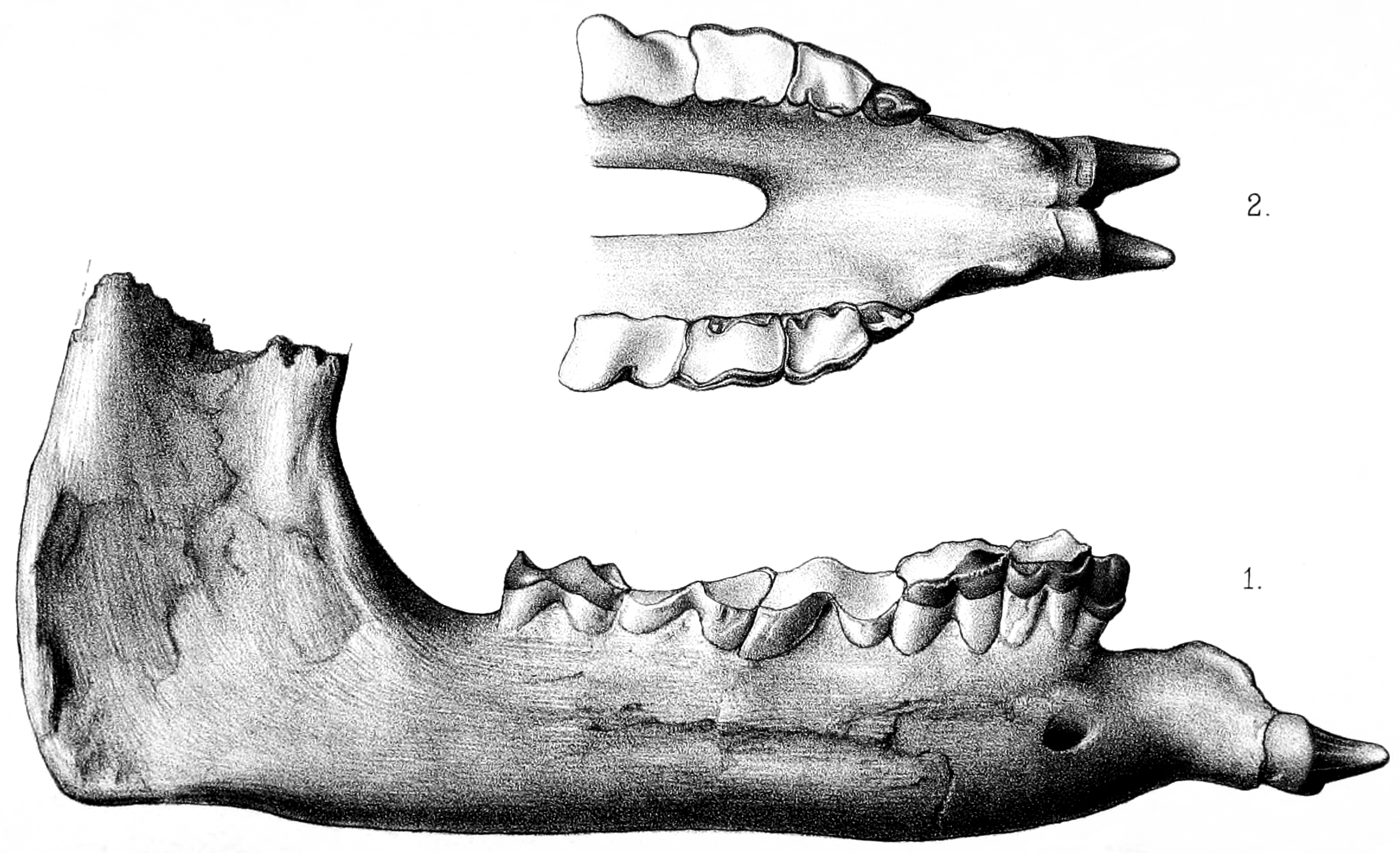
Paraceratherium jaw

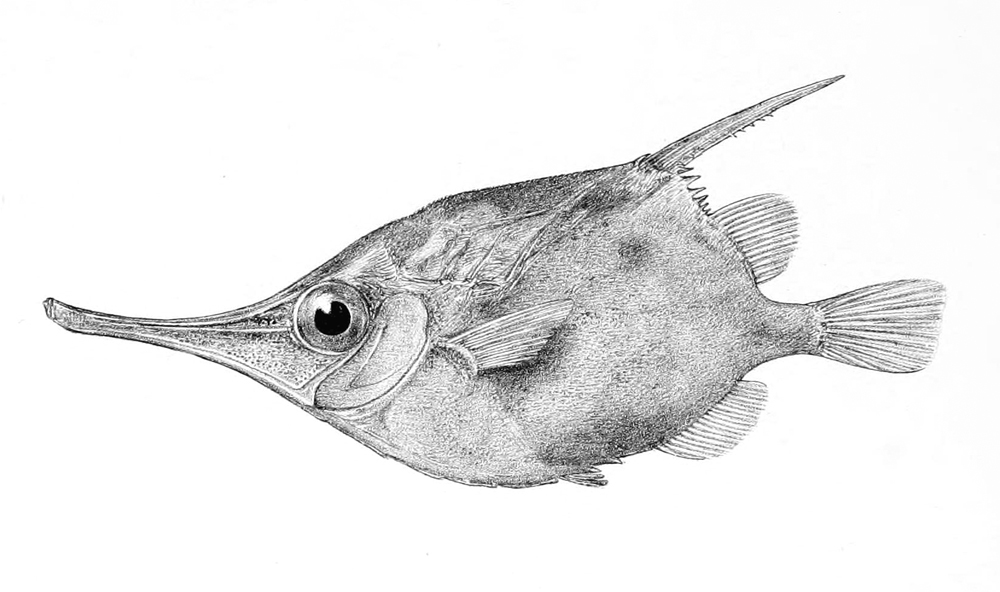
Notopogon lilliei

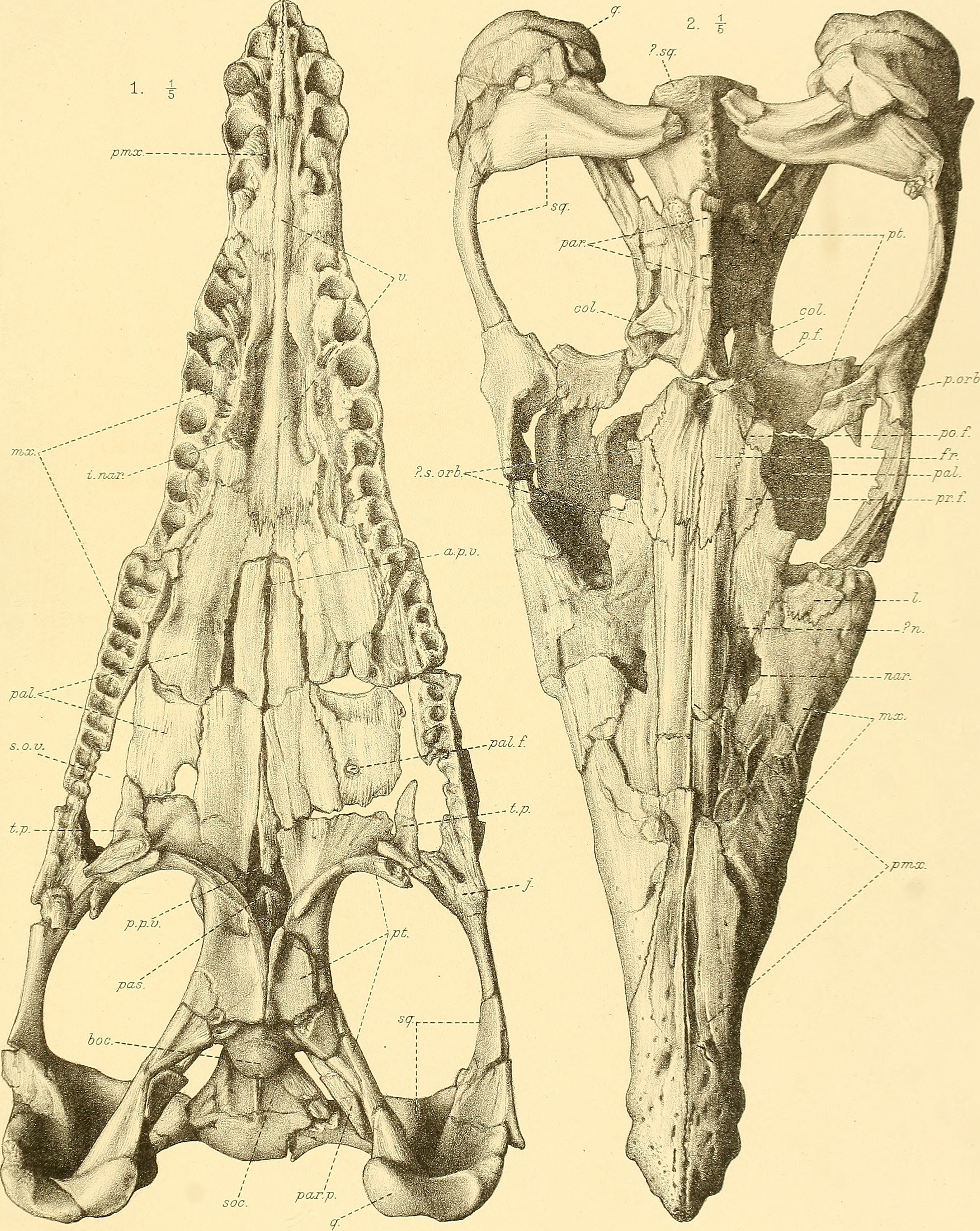
Liopleurodon skulls

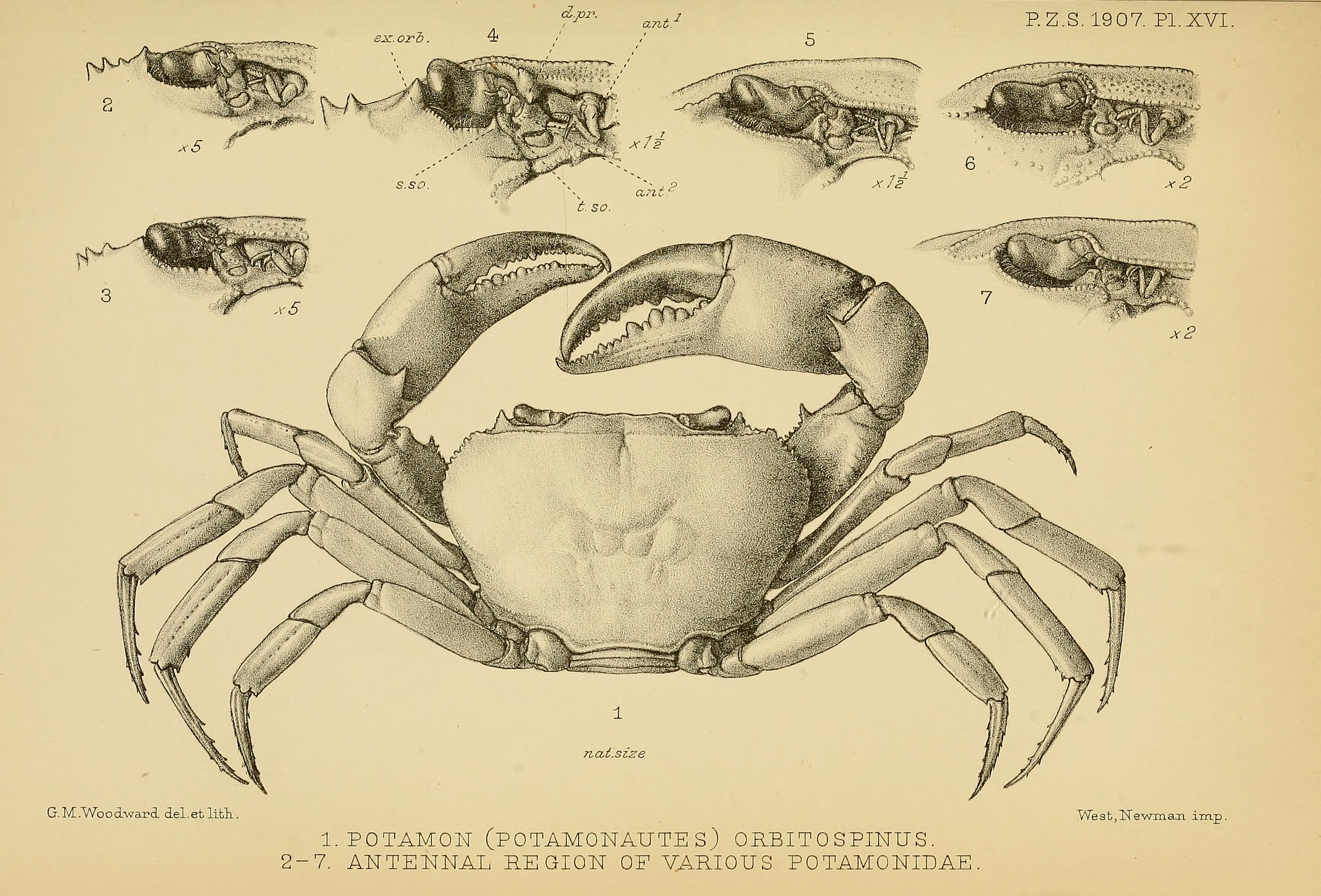
Potamonautes lirrangensis and other crabs
