= Carter Lane, London =

Street in the City of London

Coordinates: 51.513072°N 0.101420°W

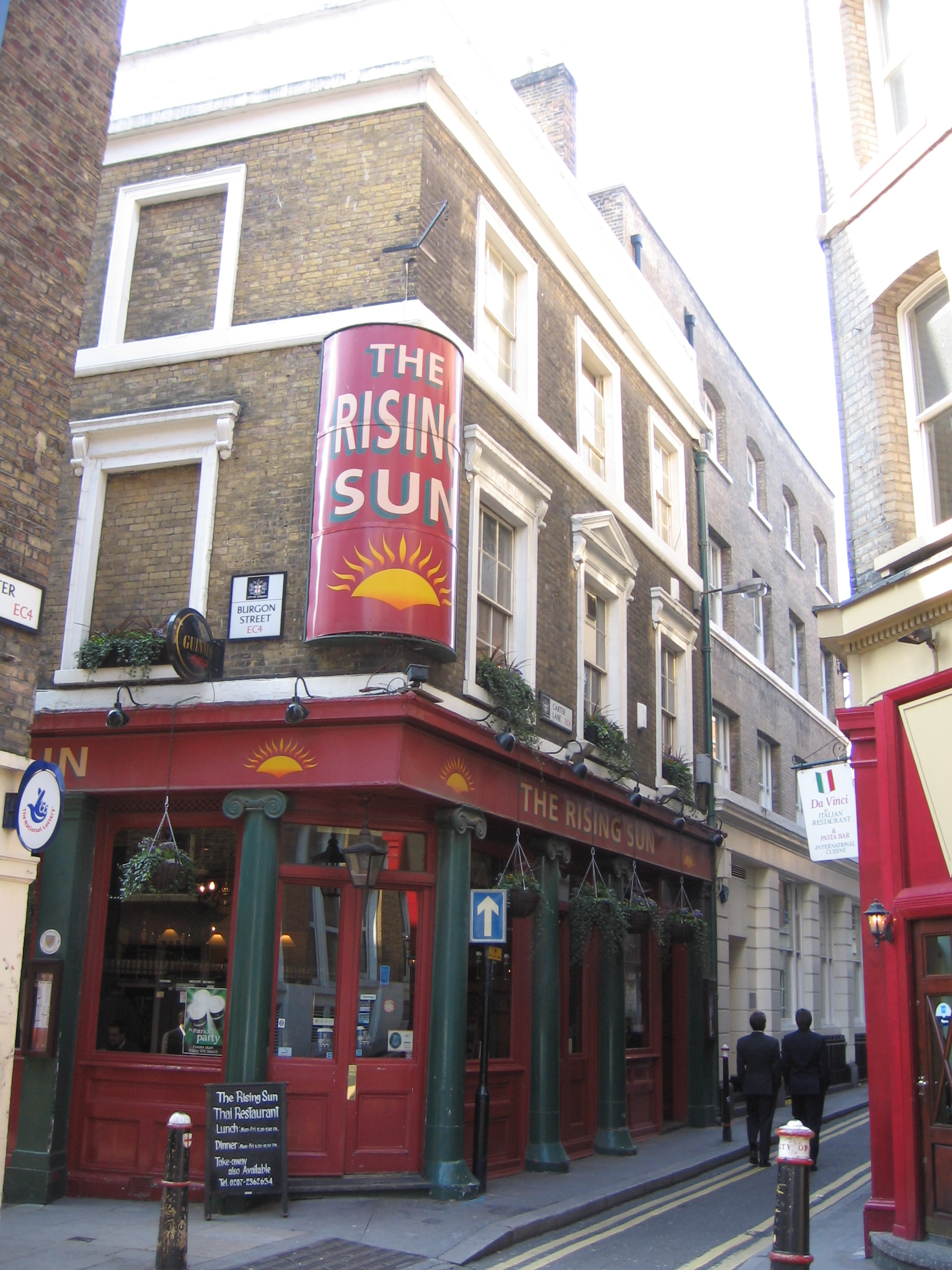
The Rising Sun

Carter Lane is a historic street in the City of London, running slightly south of Ludgate Hill and St. Paul's Cathedral. The modern Carter Lane is shown in three sections, named Shoe Makers Row, Great Carter Lane, and Little Carter Lane, on a London map of 1746.

The Rising Sun, a pub at 61 Carter Lane, is a Grade II listed building built in the early/mid-19th century. St. Paul's Cathedral School had an 1875 building located on Carter Lane, which is now a Youth Hostel (36, Carter Lane).

At 43 Carter Lane, a plaque commemorates the only surviving piece of correspondence either to, or from, William Shakespeare, which was written from that site, then the Bell Inn, by Richard Quiney and dated 25 October 1598. The letter itself is now in the care of the Shakespeare Birthplace Trust.

Fanny Umphelby, author of The Child's Guide to Knowledge, ... by a Lady, published in 1825 was born in Knowles's Court, Carter lane in 1788.
