= William Cates =

William Cates may refer to:

- William Leist Readwin Cates, English lawyer and compiler of reference works
- William Finnic Cates, namesake of the USS Cates
