= Bernicia (disambiguation) =

Bernicia was an Anglo-Saxon kingdom in the sixth and seventh centuries.

Bernicia may also refer to:

- RV Bernicia: a research vessel owned by Newcastle University
- Earl of Bernicia, a title of the kingdom

== See also ==
- Bernician Series, former term in stratigraphy
- Benicia, California, U.S.
