= The Biographical Treasury =

1838 Samuel Maunder reference book

The Biographical Treasury; A Dictionary of Universal Biography (London, 1838) was a reference book written and published by British author Samuel Maunder. It reached a 13th edition in 1866, when it was rewritten by William Leist Readwin Cates, who was subsequently editor of the fourteenth edition, and of the new edition of 1882. The book is a biographical dictionary of important persons. The biographies in the book were arranged in alphabetical order.

== Editions ==
The fourth edition was published in 1842, the seventh in 1851, the eighth in 1854 and the eleventh in 1859.

== Reception ==
The Spectator said The Biographical Treasury "is an extraordinary book".
