= Alice B. Woodward =

English illustrator

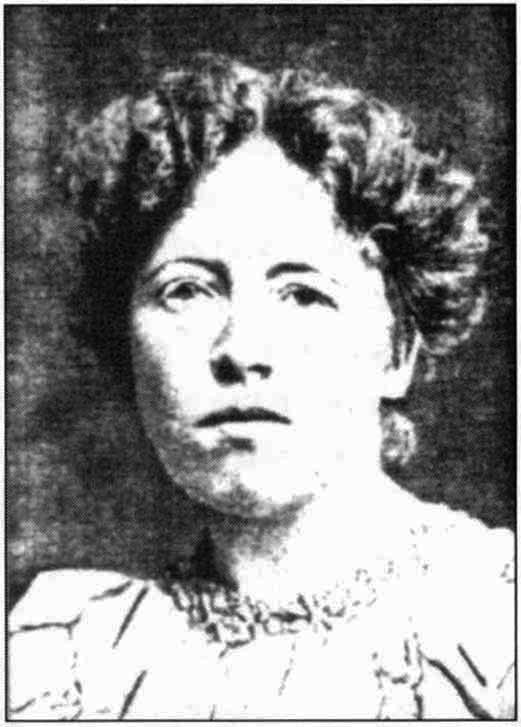
Alice Bolingbroke Woodward

Alice Bolingbroke Woodward (1862–1951) was an English artist and illustrator. She was one of the most prolific illustrators at the turn of the 20th century and is known mainly for her work in children's literature, and secondarily for her scientific illustrations.

== Biography ==
Woodward was born on 3 October 1862 in Chelsea, London. Her father Henry Woodward, was a well-known scientist and the Keeper of Geology at the Natural History Museum in London. As a child, Woodward was educated at home by governesses, along with her four sisters and two brothers (she was the fourth of seven). From a young age the children were encouraged to draw, with all of the sisters eventually becoming artists and all of the brothers becoming scientists. By her late teens, Alice was skilled enough to illustrate for her father's lectures and for the papers of his colleagues.

This allowed her to earn enough money to begin her studies at South Kensington School of Art, and later at the Westminster School of Art followed thereafter by the Académie Julian in Paris. She took lessons in illustration from Joseph Pennell and Maurice Greiffenhagen and her connection with Pennell led to commissions from J. M. Dent and Macmillan and Company to illustrate children's books. She also continued to illustrate for scientific work throughout her career. Alice Woodward died in 1951.

Her sister, Gertrude Mary Woodward, also worked in anatomical lithography, and was a lifelong friend of Beatrix Potter.

== Illustration ==
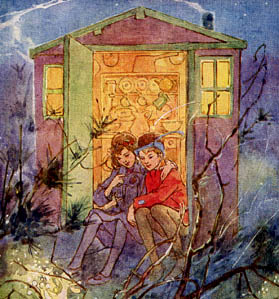
One of Woodward's illustrations for The Peter Pan Picture Book, 1907

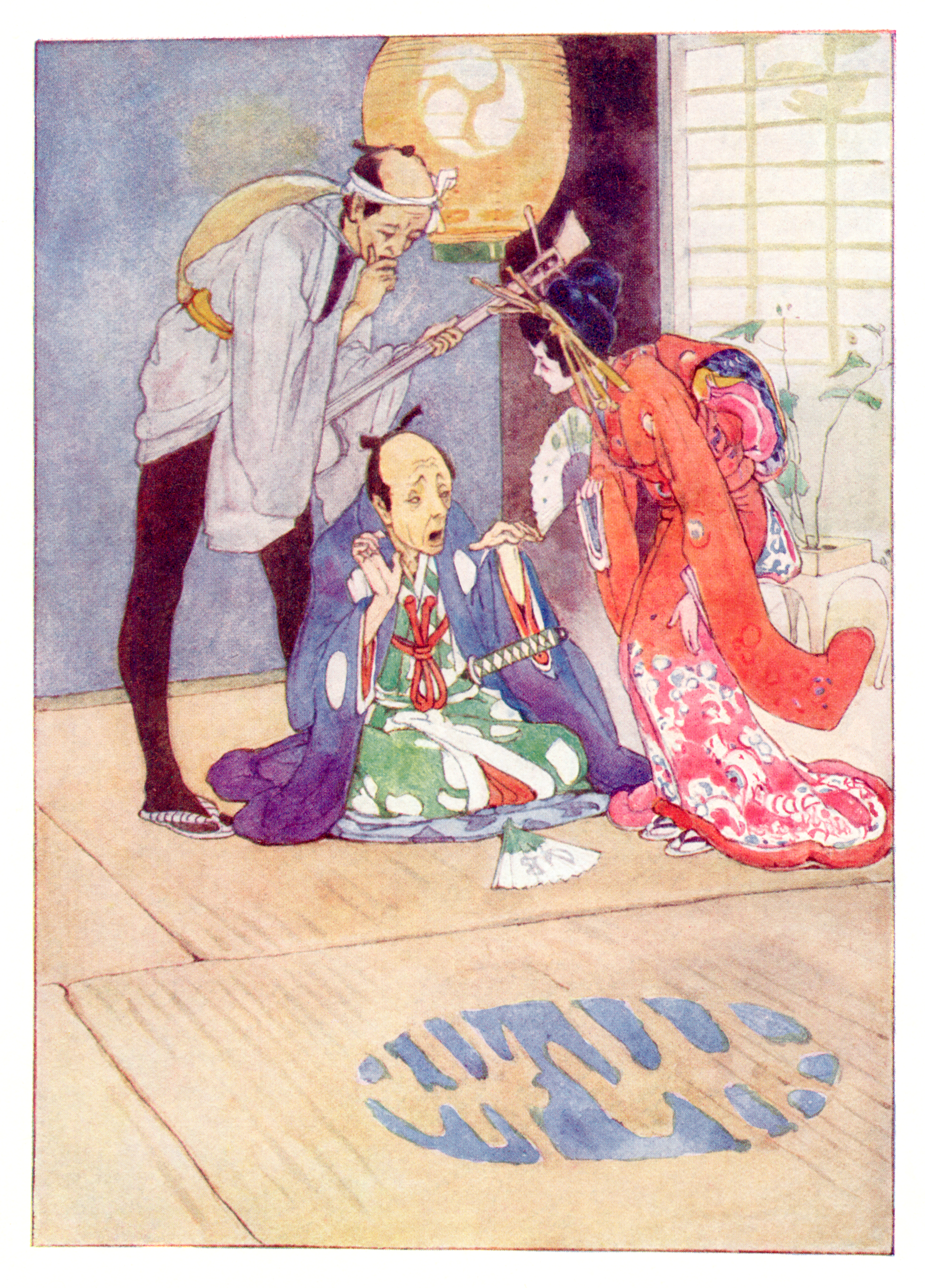
"Alas, my poor little bride that was to be!" from The Story of the Mikado (1921) by W. S. Gilbert.

Between 1896 and 1900, she worked for the Glasgow publishing house Blackie and Son Limited, illustrating a series of children's books including To Tell the King the Sky is Falling, Adventures in Toyland, and Red Apple and Silver Bells, as well as contributing to annuals and school primers through the 1920s. She succeeded Aubrey Beardsley as illustrator of W.C. Jerrold's Bon-Mots of the Eighteenth Century, and then his Bon-Mots of the Nineteenth Century. From 1907 on her main publisher was George Bell & Sons for whom she illustrated The Peter Pan Picture Book written by Daniel O'Connor, creating 28 coloured plates. This was the first illustrated version of the story prior to the publication of Barrie's novel Peter and Wendy.

She illustrated the stories of two Gilbert and Sullivan operas, Lewis Carroll's Alice's Adventures in Wonderland and Anna Sewell's classic Black Beauty. Amongst the last of her books was a volume of Myths and Legends of the Australian Aboriginals which she illustrated in 1930 at the age of 68. Woodward also exhibited paintings (of scenes in Normandy and Norfolk) and designs for process reproduction at the 91 Art Club, a Chelsea club for women artists.

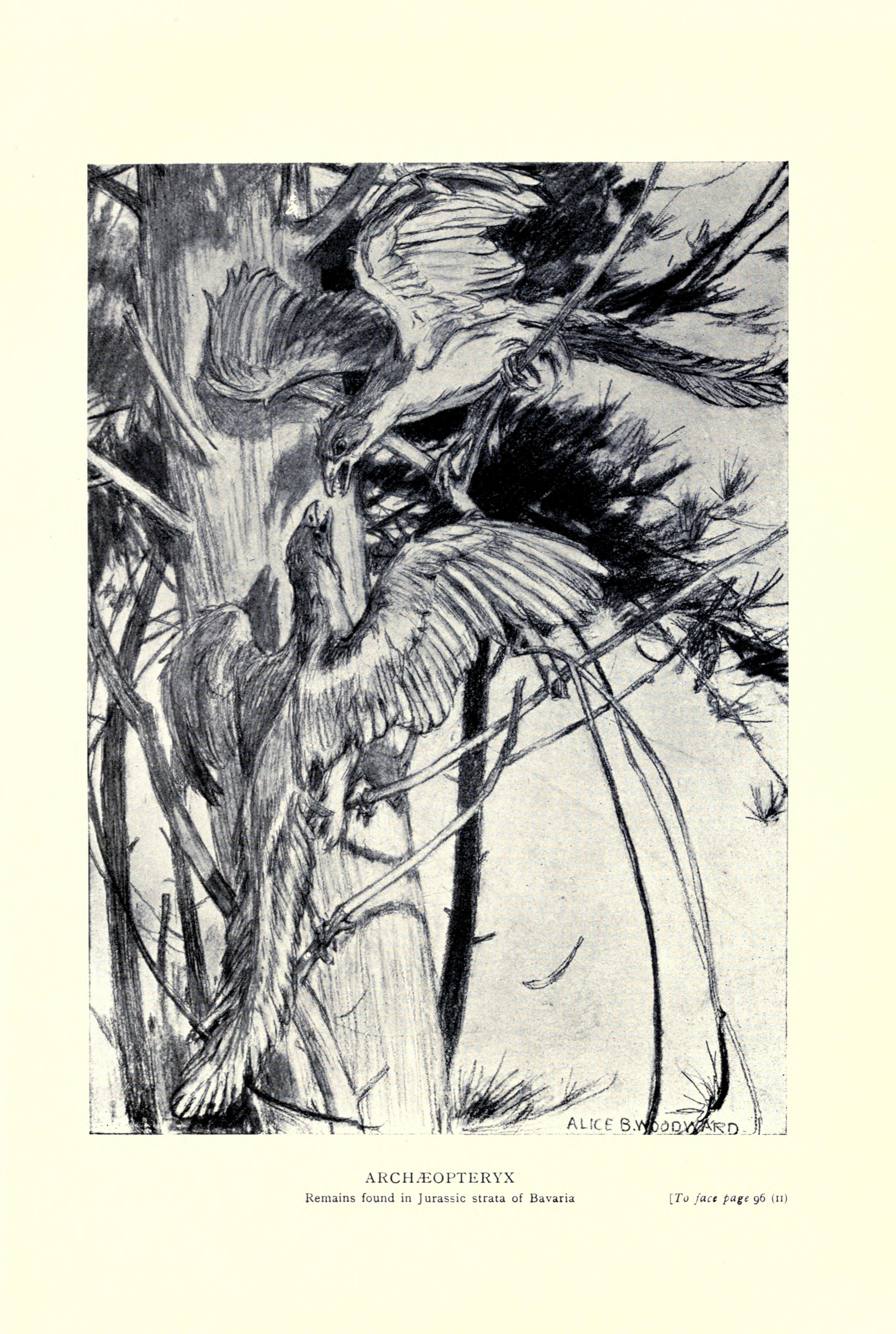
"Archæopteryx" from Evolution In the Past, by Henry R. Knipe, with illustrations by Alice B. Woodward and Ernest Bucknall.

Her work has appeared in over 80 publications including dinosaur reconstructions for the Illustrated London News and Henry R. Knipe's From Nebula to Man (?1905) and Evolution In the Past (1912).

To differentiate between her two different kinds of work, she signed all of her illustrations with a butterfly monogram, while in her scientific work she simply wrote her name. Her scientific work was known for its accuracy and precision, a necessity in technical illustration. Her drawings were also always lifelike, whether it was a drawing of a specimen or a reconstruction of a prehistoric animal.
