= William Pinnock =

18th/19th-century British writer and publisher

William Pinnock (3 February 1782 in Alton, Hampshire – 21 October 1843 in London) was a British publisher and educational writer.

He was at first a schoolmaster, then a bookseller. In 1817 he went to London and, in partnership with Samuel Maunder, began to publish cheap educational works. The firm's first productions were a series of Catechisms, planned by Pinnock, consisting of short popular manuals, arranged in the form of question and answer, of the different departments of knowledge. This style was later copied by Fanny Umphelby. The dialogues were followed by abridged editions of Goldsmith's histories of England, Greece and Rome, and a series of county histories which were no less profitable. Pinnock lost nearly all his money in outside speculation.

Pinnock is mentioned, as a depressing set of texts, in contrast to Washington Irving's stories, in George Eliot's novel The Mill on the Floss (1860): Maggie, speaking about her 'gloomy fancy' to her cousin Lucy says:

"Perhaps it comes from the school diet – watery rice-pudding spiced with Pinnock. Let us hope it will give way before my mother's custards and this charming Geoffrey Crayon."

Pinnock's son, William Henry Pinnock (1813–1885), a clergyman, was the editor and author of several elementary textbooks and scriptural manuals, and of various works on ecclesiastical law and usage.

== See also ==
- Pinnock's First Catechism for Children, 1837 on Archive.org
- Samuel Maunder
