= Bernard Bolingbroke Woodward =

English minister and librarian (1816–1869)

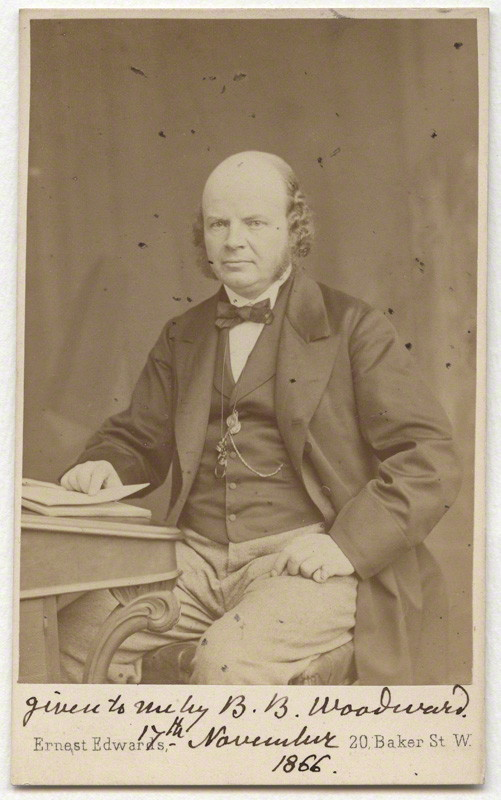

Bernard Bolingbroke Woodward (2 May 1816 – 12 October 1869) was an English nonconformist minister, antiquarian, and Royal Librarian at Windsor Castle.

== Life ==
The eldest son of Samuel Woodward the geologist, Woodward was born at Norwich on 2 May 1816; the geologist Samuel Pickworth Woodward was his younger brother. He was sent in March 1822 to the Grey Friars Priory, a private school kept by William Brooke, to whom on 29 September 1828 he was apprenticed for four years. On the expiration of this apprenticeship he worked for a time under his father's supervision, copying armorial bearings and other heraldic devices for Hudson Gurney. He also studied botany, and kept notes, some of which were used by Hewett Cottrell Watson.

In January 1834 Woodward went as tutor in J. S. Buck's school at East Dereham, Norfolk, and late in the following year he obtained a post in the banking house of Messrs. Gurney at Great Yarmouth. Through the influence of friends at East Dereham he became attracted to the congregational ministry, and on coming of age left Yarmouth and went to study under William Legge at Fakenham, Norfolk, and Robert Drane at Guestwick. In 1838 he entered as a student at the newly established Highbury College, Middlesex, and graduated B.A. London, 17 June 1841. On 27 April 1843 he was publicly recognised pastor of the independent church of Wortwell-with-Harleston in Norfolk.

Woodward soon after began to apply himself to literary work, with the friendship of John Childs, head of the printing firm at Bungay, and acted for a time also as tutor to his grandsons. At the end of 1848 he resigned his pastorate, and, with the view of devoting himself solely to literature, removed to St John's Wood, London, in March 1849. In November 1853 he moved to Bungay to be nearer to his friends the Childs, who were concerned in the production of his larger works, and whom he assisted in many of their undertakings; but in 1858 he returned to the neighbourhood of Hampstead.

On 2 July 1860 Woodward was appointed librarian in ordinary to the queen at Windsor Castle. Under the superintendence of the Prince Consort he began the rearrangement of the collection of drawings by the Old Masters at Windsor. He died at his official residence, Royal Mews, Pimlico, on 12 October 1869; he was succeeded as Royal Librarian by Richard Rivington Holmes. Woodward was elected a Fellow of the Society of Antiquaries in 1857.

== Family ==
In 1843 Woodward married Fanny Emma, ninth daughter of Thomas Teulon of Berkeley Street, London, the descendant of a Huguenot family. By her he had three daughters. She died on 30 April 1850, and he married, on 19 August 1851, Emma, seventh daughter of George Barham of Withersdale Hall, Suffolk.

== Works ==
Woodward was author of:

- The History of Wales, London [1850–3].
- The Natural History of the Year (originally issued in the Teacher's Offering, 1851), London, 1852; 3rd ed. 1863; revised edit. (so called) 1872.
- The History of the United States of North America (by W. H. Bartlett as far as vol. i. p. 536), New York [1855–6], 3 vols.
- First Lessons on the English Reformation, London [1857]; 2nd edit. 1860.
- First Lessons in Astronomy (5th edit. rewritten by B. B. Woodward), London [1857].
- First Lessons in the Evidences of Christianity (originally issued in the Teacher's Offering, 1858–9), London [1860?]; 2nd edit. 1865.
- A General History of Hampshire (as far as p. 317, afterwards carried on by Theodor C. Wilks), London [1859–62].
- Encyclopædia of Chronology, with William Leist Readwin Cates, who completed it, London, 1872.

At the time of Woodward's death he was working on a Life of Leonardo da Vinci, which was to have been illustrated from drawings in the royal collection. He also wrote articles and reviews for the Eclectic Review, Sharpe's London Magazine, the Gentleman's Magazine, and other periodicals.

Woodward edited:

- The History and Antiquities of Norwich Castle, by his father, 1847.
- Barclay's Complete Dictionary of the English Language, new edit. 1851, for which he wrote articles, especially in biography and geography.
- Samuel Maunder's Treasury of Knowledge, new ed. 1859, for which he wrote an English grammar, besides rewriting much of the rest.

Woodward also founded and edited The Fine Arts Quarterly Review, which appeared from May 1863 to June 1867. He began a translation of Élisée Reclus's La Terre, which was completed by his brother, Henry Woodward.

- as translator, with Henry Woodward as editor: The Earth: a Descriptive History of the Phenomena of the Life of the Globe, 2 vols., 1871 (from the original French of Élisée Reclus)
  - La Terre. Description des phénomènes de la vie du globe, Paris, Hachette, 1867–1868, 2 vol. (datés 1868–1869), 1554 p.
    - t. I, Les Continents, Paris, Hachette, 1867 (daté 1868), 783 p., texte intégral sur Gallica. Texte en ligne disponible sur IRIS, 1877
    - t. II, L’Océan, l’atmosphère, la vie, Paris, Hachette, 1868 (daté 1869), 771 p., texte intégral sur Gallica.
