= Bernard Barham Woodward =

British malacologist and author

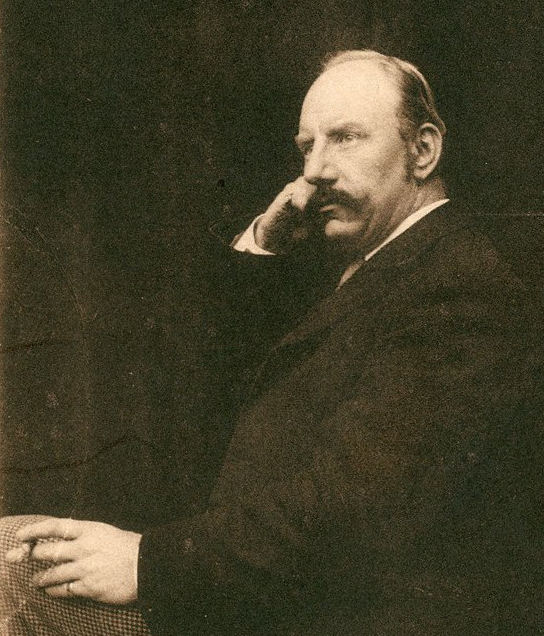
Bernard Barham Woodward

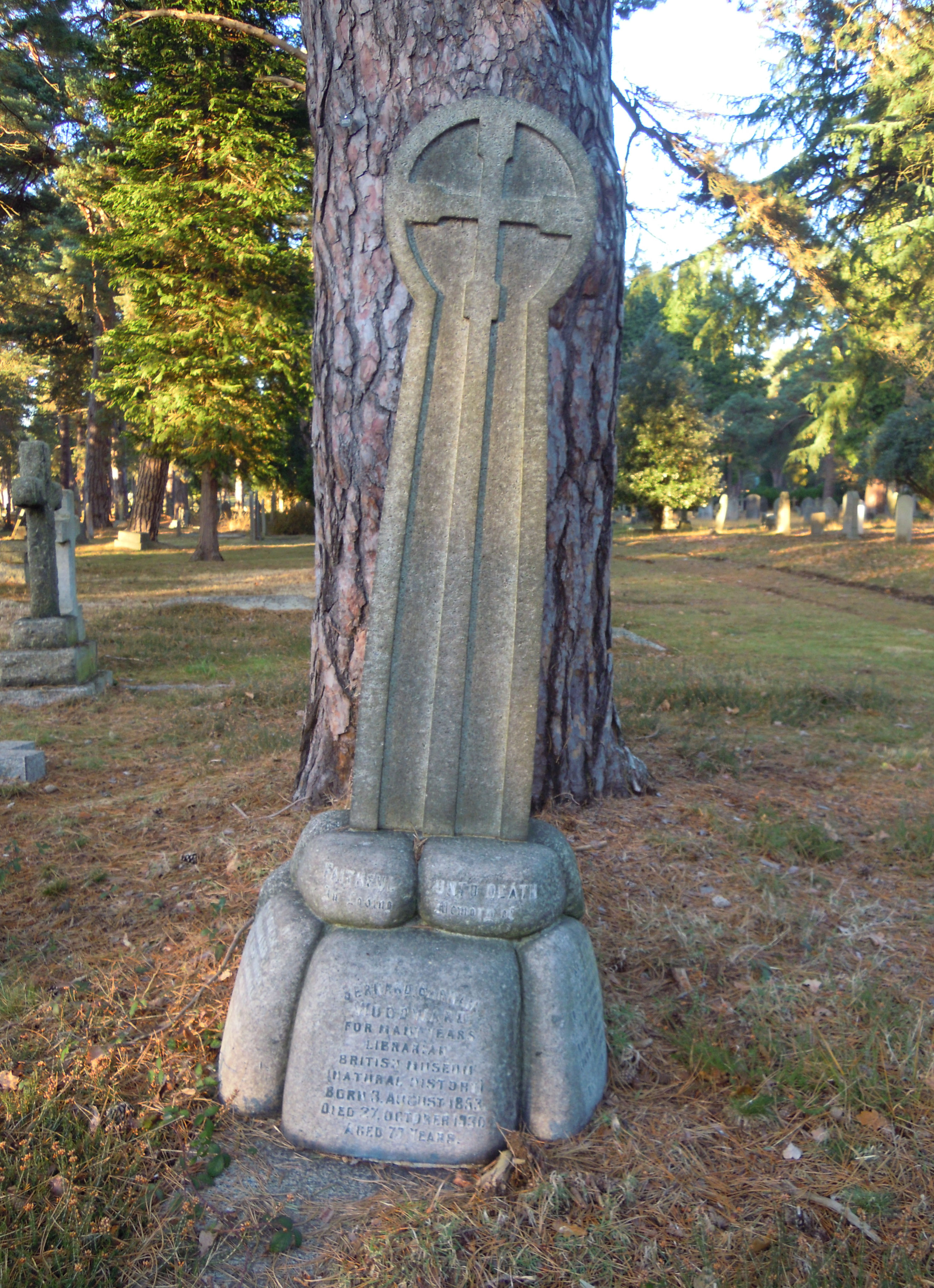
The grave of Bernard Barham Woodward in Brookwood Cemetery

Bernard Barham Woodward (3 August 1853 – 27 October 1930) was a British malacologist and author of a catalogue of the works of Carl Linnaeus. He was a member of staff at the British Museum and then the Natural History Museum.

== Biography ==
He was the son of the geologist Samuel Pickworth Woodward, a nephew of the antiquarian Bernard Bolingbroke Woodward and the geologist Henry Woodward and brother of the geologist Horace Bolingbroke Woodward. He was one of the last surviving members of the British Museum Natural History staff which transferred in 1881 from the British Museum to the Natural History Museum.

Woodward was an Assistant in the British Museum and on becoming Librarian at the Natural History Museum became responsible for the general catalogue of the books. He worked in this position from 1903 to his retirement in 1920, by which time the Library had gained an international reputation. During that period Woodward produced the five main volumes of the catalogue and a supplementary volume.

In common with his uncle Henry Woodward, formerly Keeper of Geology in the British Museum, and his brother Horace Bolingbroke Woodward of the Geological Survey, Woodward had an interest in natural history that extended beyond his work at the Natural History Museum, conducting his own researches into mollusca, and especially British mollusca. Based on this work the Trustees of the British Museum published his books on the British species of Pisidium and the British freshwater mollusca, while his book on the life of mollusca was published just before World War I. For his work in this field Woodward was elected a Fellow of the Linnean Society of London and the Royal Microscopical Society, and he was for some years President of the Malacological Society of London. He frequently contributed to the Dictionary of National Biography (DNB).

== Personal life ==
He was twice married and twice widowed, firstly to the novelist Emma Hosken (1845–1884) whom he married in 1882, and then to Jane E. Mayne Randles (1854–1904) whom he married in 1891. He left no family.

He is buried in Brookwood Cemetery near Woking in Surrey.

== Publications ==
- B. B. Woodward, Catalogue of the books, manuscripts, maps and drawings in the British Museum (Natural history), London, 1903–1940.
- Bernard Barham Woodward & W.R. Wilson, A catalogue of the works of Linnaeus (and publications more immediately relating thereto) preserved in the libraries of the British Museum (Bloomsbury) and the British Museum (Natural History) (South Kensington), London, 1907, 27 p.
- B. B. Woodward, The life of the mollusca, London, 1913, 158 p.
- B. B. Woodward, Catalogue of the British species of Pisidium (recent and fossil), London, 1913, 144 p.
