= William Leist Readwin Cates =

English lawyer and compiler of reference works

William Leist Readwin Cates (12 November 1821 – 9 December 1895) was an English lawyer and compiler of reference works.

== Life ==
The eldest son of Robert Gates, a solicitor of Fakenham, Norfolk, and his wife, Mary Ann Readwin, was born there on 12 November 1821. He was educated for the law under a private tutor, and after passing his examinations at London University went to Chatteris, Cambridgeshire. He subsequently moved to Gravesend for about a year, but, failing to establish a practice, took an appointment in 1844 as articled clerk to John Barfield, a solicitor at Thatcham, Berkshire.

Cates abandoned the legal profession, first for private tuition, and then to write. In 1848 he was at Wilmslow, Cheshire, and some years later at Didsbury, near Manchester. In 1860 he moved to London, in order to co-operate with his friend Bernard Bolingbroke Woodward.

Failing health compelled Cates to leave London in September 1887 for Hayes, near Uxbridge, where he died on 9 December 1895.

== Works ==
Cates and Woodward wrote the Encyclopædia of Chronology (1872). Cates also wrote:

- Early poems and prose (1843)
- The Pocket Date Book, London, 1863, which had a second edition
- Dictionary of General Biography (London, 1867; 3rd ed. 1880)
- History of England from the Death of Edward the Confessor to the Death of King John, London, 1874

He edited and largely re-wrote The Biographical Treasury by Samuel Maunder in its 13th edition (1866), superintending the 14th edition in 1873 and a subsequent one in 1882. He also translated and edited vols. vi. to viii. of Jean-Henri Merle d'Aubigné's History of the Reformation in Europe in the Time of Calvin, London, 1875-8. He contributed the article "Chronology" in the ninth edition of the Encyclopædia Britannica.

== Family ==
On 25 July 1845 Cates married Catherine, daughter of Aquila Robins of Holt, Norfolk.

== Notes ==
Attribution

This article incorporates text from a publication now in the public domain: Lee, Sidney, ed. (1901). "Cates, William Leist Readwin". Dictionary of National Biography (1st supplement). Vol. 1. London: Smith, Elder & Co.
