= Emma Hosken =

British novelist

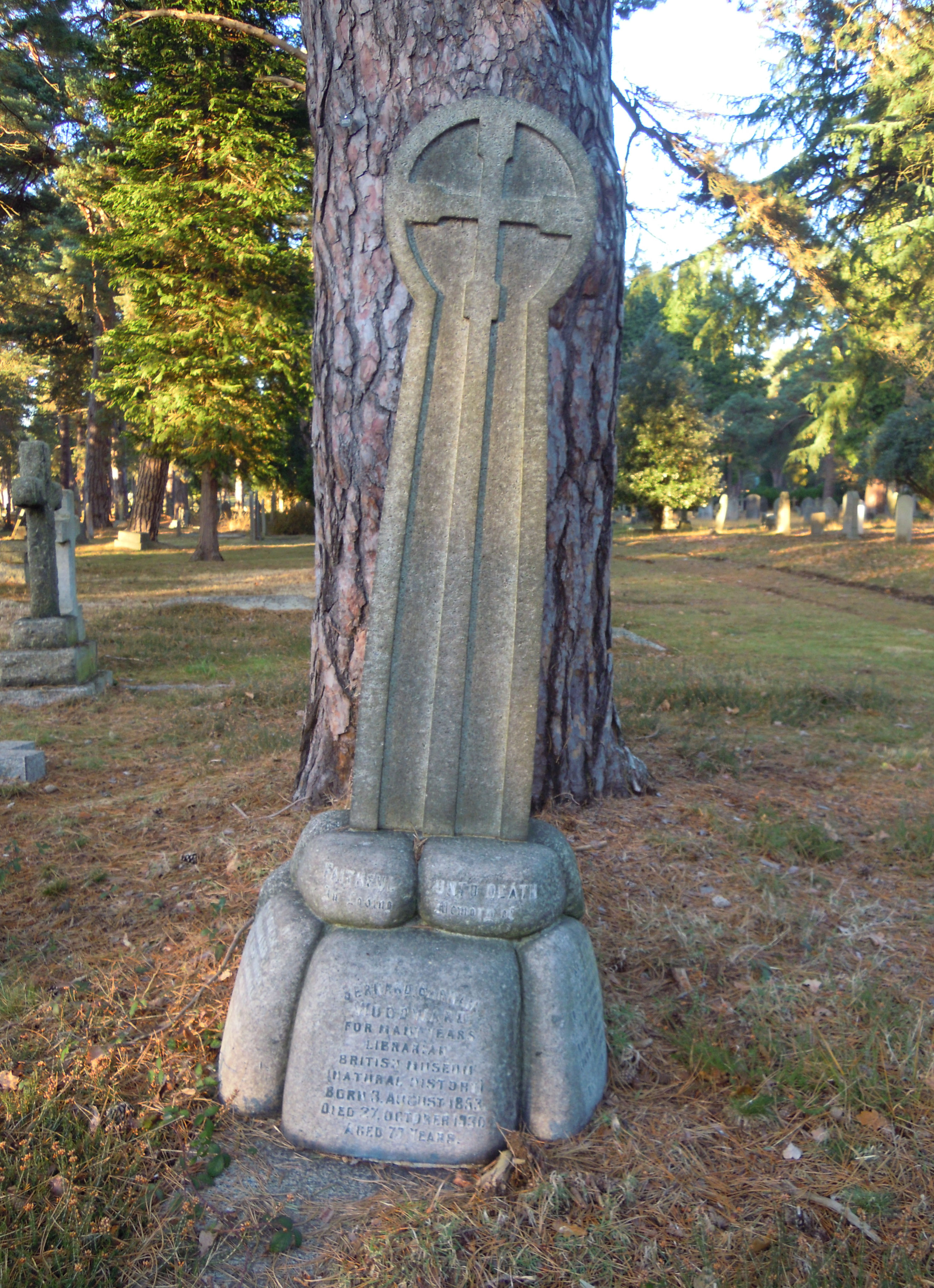
The grave of Emma Hosken and Bernard Barham Woodward in Brookwood Cemetery.

Emma Hosken (also Emma Hosken Woodward; 11 August 1845 – 16 July 1884) was a British novelist of the Victorian era. Her last novel was published posthumously in 1885 by her husband Bernard Barham Woodward.

Hosken was born in 1845 in Penryn in Cornwall, the daughter of Richard Hosken and Emily (née Nettle). She married her distant cousin the Rev. Thomas Butterfill Hosken, the Rector of Llandefaelog Fach in Wales. The couple had three children; her infant son and husband died of diphtheria in 1869 and 1870 respectively following which Hosken and her two daughters returned to Penryn to live with her mother.

As a widow Hosken wrote two anonymous novels, Married for Money (1875) and Bitter to Sweet End (1877). In 1881 she was a boarder at the Sisters of Mercy in Holborn. In 1882 she married Bernard Barham Woodward (1854–1930), nine years her junior and the Librarian at the Natural History Museum but she died in July 1884. Woodward posthumously published her last book, Men, Women, and Progress (1885), a political discussion advocating "certain much-needed reforms" relating to the rights of women.

She is buried with her second husband Bernard Barham Woodward and his second wife in Brookwood Cemetery in Surrey.

== Bibliography ==
- Married for Money, 1 vol., Samuel Tinsley, London (1875)
- Bitter to Sweet End: A Novel, 3 vol., Samuel Tinsley, London (1877)
- Men, Women, and Progress, Delau & Co, London (1885)
