= Bernician Series =

In geology, Bernician Series was a term proposed by Samuel Pickworth Woodward in 1856 (Manual of Mollusca, p. 409) for the lower portion of the Carboniferous System, below the Millstone Grit. The name was suggested by that of the ancient province of Bernicia on the Anglo-Scottish borderland. It is practically equivalent to the "Dinantian" of Albert Auguste de Lapparent and Ernest Munier-Chalmas (1893).

In 1875 George Tate's "Calcareous and Carbonaceous" groups of the Carboniferous Limestone series of Northumberland were united by George Lebour into a single series, to which he applied the name "Bernician"; but later he spoke of the whole of the Carboniferous rocks of Northumberland and its borders as of the "Bernician type". "Demetian" was the corresponding designation proposed by Woodward for the Upper Carboniferous rocks.

The sequence of rocks below the Bernician were referred to as the Tuedian. Because the terms Bernician and Tuedian cannot be satisfactorily applied to areas beyond those where they were originally described, they are no longer used in modern stratigraphy.
