= Bernard Henry Woodward =

English-born Australian museum director and naturalist

Bernard H. Woodward
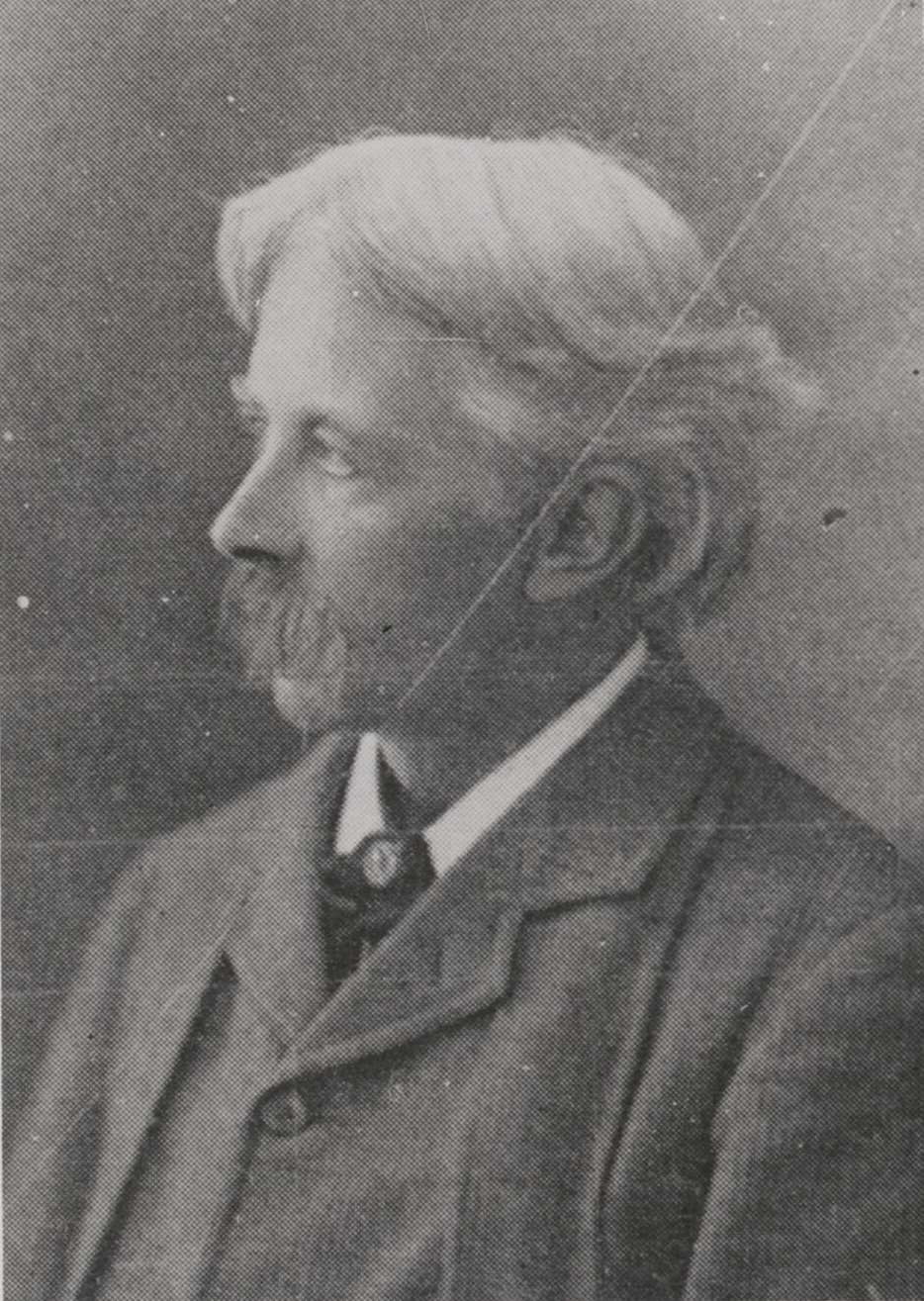

Bernard Henry Woodward FGS (31 January 1846 – 14 October 1916) was an English-born Australian museum director and naturalist, associated with the Western Australian Museum from its beginnings in 1889 until 1914.

Born in Islington, London, to geologist Samuel Pickworth Woodward, Bernard came to Western Australia in 1889. He is commemorated in the scientific names of several organisms, including the birds Amytornis woodwardi, Colluricincla woodwardi, and the tree Eucalyptus woodwardii.
