= Horace Bolingbroke Woodward =

British geologist (1848–1914)

Horace Bolingbroke Woodward FGS FRS, (20 August 1848 – 6 February 1914) was a British geologist who participated in the Geological Survey of England and Wales from 1867 until his retirement in 1908. He was vice-president of the Geological Society, where he was elected a Fellow in 1868; elected a Fellow of the Royal Society in 1896, awarded the Murchison Medal in 1897, and the Wollaston Medal in 1909.

He was second son of geologist Samuel Pickworth Woodward, himself second son of geologist and antiquary Samuel Woodward. His brother was malacologist Bernard Barham Woodward.

== Selected works ==
- Woodward, Horace B (1876). The Geology of England and Wales. London: Longman Green & Co.
- Woodward, Horace B. (1893). The Lias of England and Wales (Yorkshire excepted). Memoirs of the Geological survey of the United Kingdom. Vol. 3. London: HMSO.
- Woodward, Horace B (1907). The History of the Geological Society of London. London: Geological Society of London.
- Woodward, Horace B (1910). The Geology of Water-Supply. Arnold's geological series. London: Edward Arnold.
- Woodward, Horace B (1911). History of Geology. New York: G P Putnam's sons.
