= Fanny Umphelby =

British author

- Born: 1788
- Died: 9 April 1852 (aged 63–64); Bow, Middlesex
- Writing career
- Notable works: The Child's Guide to Knowledge, ... by a Lady

Fanny Umphelby (1788 – 9 April 1852) was a British author who wrote a popular primer known by the shortened title The Child's Guide to Knowledge, ... by a Lady.

== Life ==
Umphelby was born in Knowles's Court, Doctor's Commons, in the Parish of St Mary Magdalen, Old Fish Street in the City of London. She wrote The Child's Guide to Knowledge, ... by a Lady. The book was first published in 1825 anonymously by 'A Lady'. But Umphelby's fame is due to her nephew, Robert Avey Ward, adding her biography to the Dictionary of National Biography. Before this, the author was simply 'A Lady' and subsequently "Fanny Ward", Robert Avey Ward's mother. The 1900 edition states that on publication in 1825, it "became at once a standard" book in the classroom.

The book was first published in 1825 as 262 Questions and Answers; or, the Children's Guide to Knowledge. Being a collection of useful and familiar questions, on every day subjects adapted for young children, and arranged in the easiest and plainest language, with the modest attribution "by a Lady", but was later retitled to The Child's Guide to Knowledge; Being a Collection of Useful and Familiar Questions and Answers on Every-day Subjects, Adapted for Young Persons, and Arranged in the Most Simple and Easy Language. The coy attribution of "by a Lady" caused some confusion as to authorship. An edition from 1830 has her sister, the wife of Robert Ward, being credited for early editions of the work, although by 1900, the Dictionary of National Biography was prepared to positively assert that Umphelby was the sole original author. By 1899, The Child's Guide to Knowledge was in its 58th edition, with later editions having been updated by her nephew, Robert A. Ward.

Encyclopedias for children in varying subjects were in vogue in the early 19th century. The Oxford Companion to Children's Literature (1984) suggests that The Child's Guide to Knowledge, ... by a Lady was modelled on William Pinnock's Catechisms and Richmal Mangnall's Miscellaneous Questions for the Use of Young People.

Umphelby utilised the techniques of the Elucidarium, a 12th-century encyclopedia that presented information as a Socratic dialogue between a teacher and his disciple, but varied the formula to have the pupil present the information instead of the teacher. The book caused a resurgence of popularity around books based on dialogue.

Umphelby also authored A Guide to Jewish History.

Umphelby died, unmarried, in Bow, Middlesex, on 9 April 1852.
