= Samuel Woodward =

English geologist and antiquary

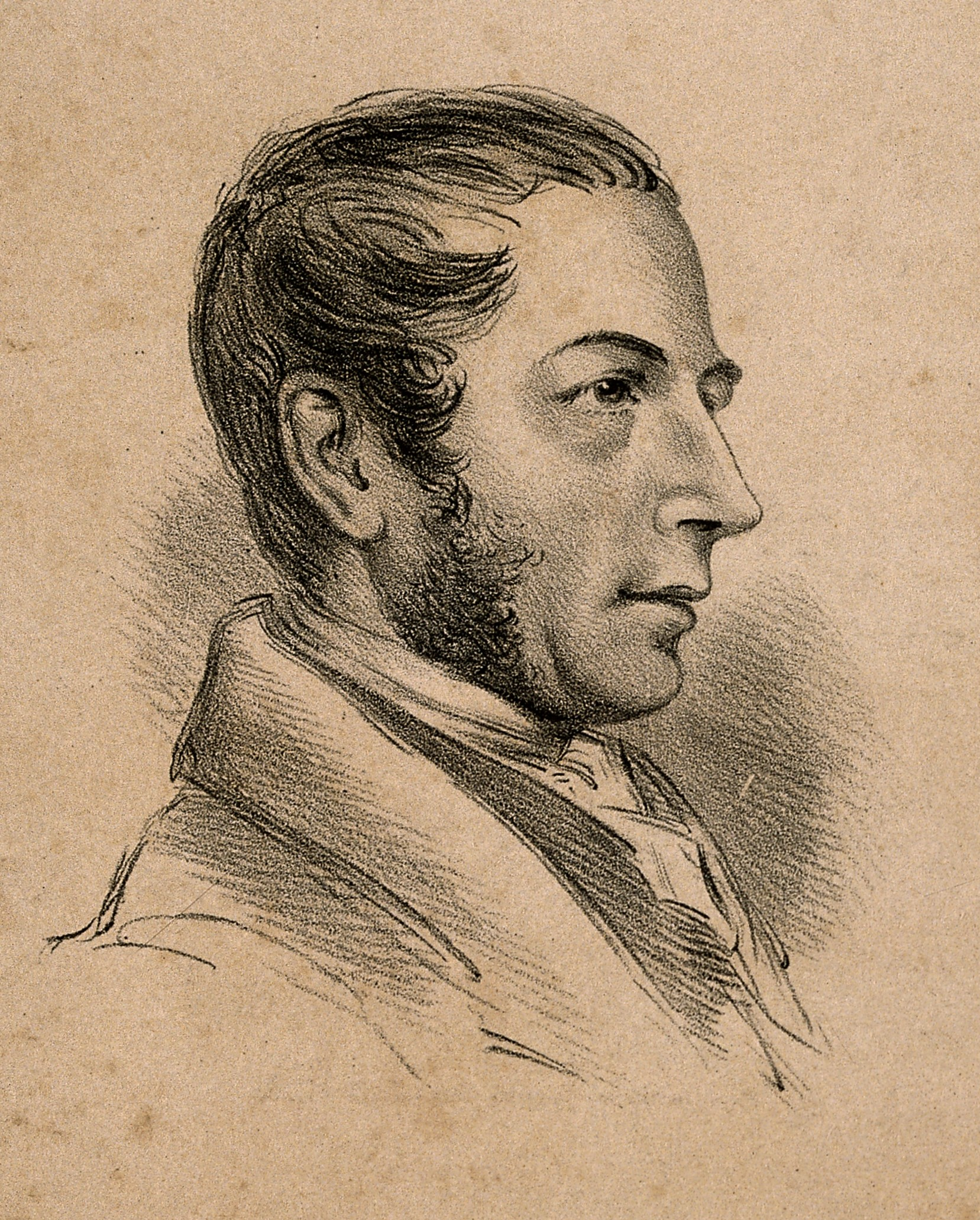
- Born: 3 October 1790; Norwich, England
- Died: 14 January 1838 (aged 47)
- Children: Bernard B. Woodward; Samuel P. Woodward; Henry Woodward
- Scientific career
- Fields: Geology, Antiquary

Samuel Woodward (3 October 1790 – 14 January 1838), English geologist and antiquary, was born at Norwich.

He was for the most part self-educated. Apprenticed in 1804 to a manufacturer of camlets and bombazines, a taste for serious study was stimulated by his master, Alderman John Herring and by Joseph John Gurney. Becoming interested in geology and archaeology, he began to form the collection which after his death was purchased for the Norwich museum. In 1820 he obtained a clerkship in Gurney's (afterwards Barclay's) bank at Norwich, and Hudson Gurney and Dawson Turner (of Yarmouth), both fellows of the Royal Society, encouraged his scientific work.

He communicated to the Archaeologia articles on the round church towers of Norfolk, the Roman remains of the country, etc., and other papers on natural history and geology to the Mag. Nat. Hist. and Phil. Mag.

He was author of:

- A Synoptical Table of British Organic Remains (1830), the first work of its kind in Britain
- An Outline of the Geology of Norfolk (1833)
- The Norfolk Topographer's Manual (1842) issued posthumously
- The History and Antiquities of Norwich Castle (1847) issued posthumously

His eldest son, Bernard Bolingbroke Woodward (1816–1869), was librarian and keeper of the prints and drawings at Windsor Castle from 1860 until his death. The second son, Samuel Pickworth Woodward (1821–1865), became in 1845 professor of geology and natural history in the Royal Agricultural College, Cirencester, and in 1848 was appointed assistant in the department of geology and mineralogy in the British Museum. He was author of A Manual of the Mollusca (in three parts, 1851, 1853 and 1856). Samuel Woodward's youngest son, Henry was also a noted geologist.

See Memoir of S. Woodward (with bibliography) in Trans. Norfolk Nat. Soc. (1879), and of SP Woodward (with portrait and bibliography), Ibid. (1882), by HB Woodward.
