= Samuel Pickworth Woodward =

English geologist and malacologist

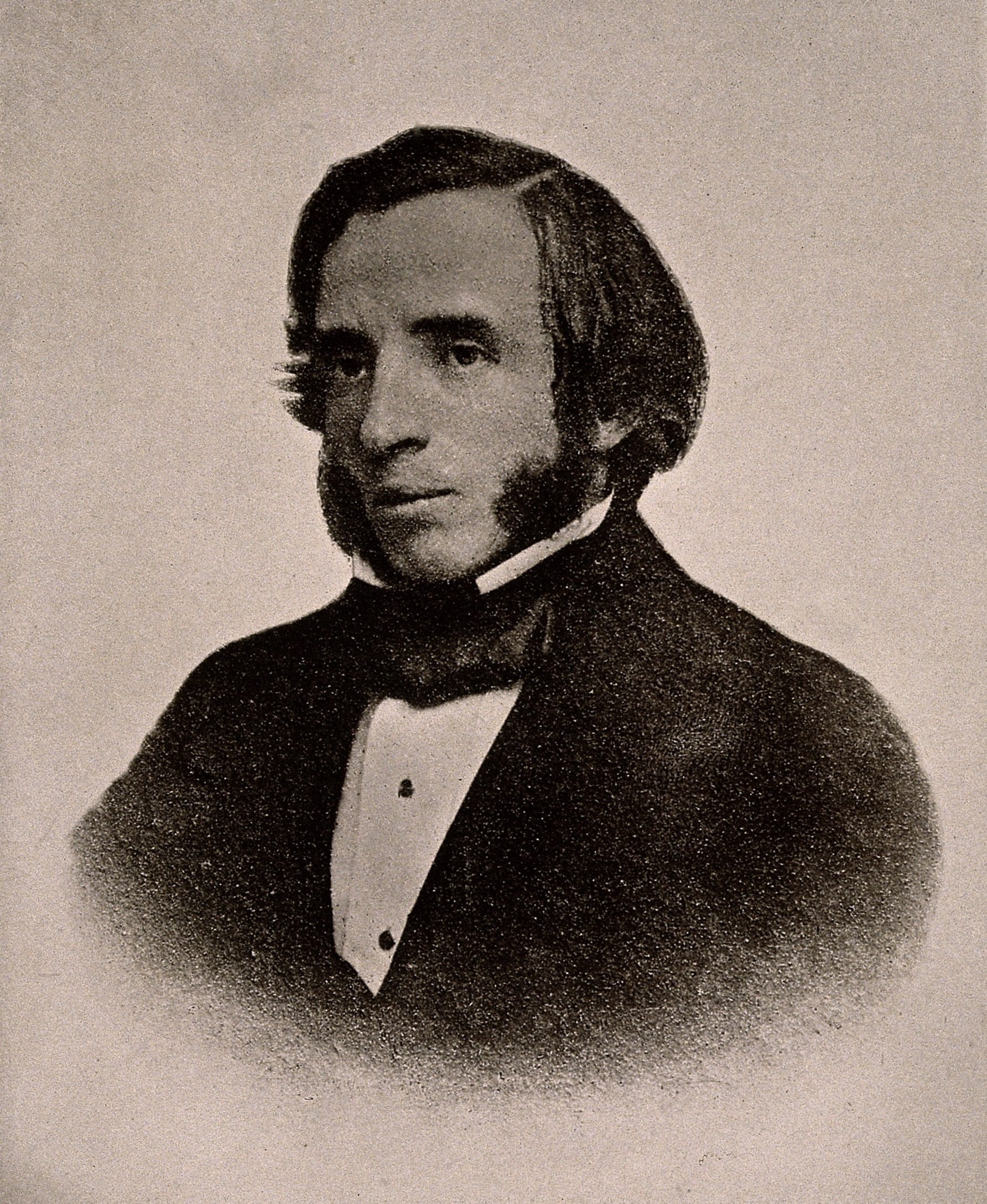
- Born: 17 September 1821; Norwich, England
- Died: 11 July 1865 (aged 43); Herne Bay, England
- Resting place: Highgate Cemetery
- Spouse: Elizabeth Teulon (m. 1845)
- Children: Bernard Henry Woodward; Horace Bolingbroke Woodward
- Father: Samuel Woodward
- Scientific career
- Institutions: British Museum; Royal Agricultural College

Samuel Pickworth Woodward (17 September 1821 – 11 July 1865) was an English geologist and malacologist.

== Biography ==
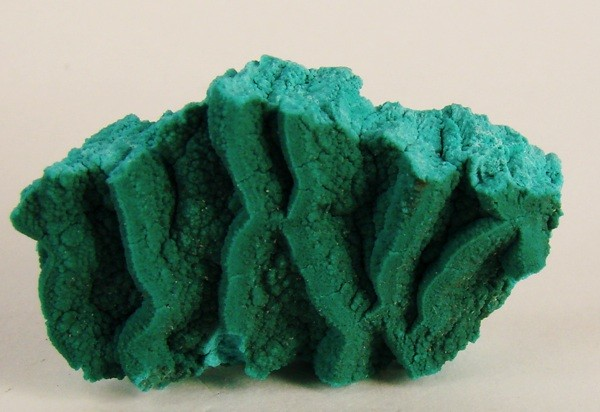
Specimen of Woodwardite - Chemical Formula: Cu_{4}Al_{2}(SO_{4})(OH)_{12}•2-4(H_{2}O)

Woodward was born 17 September 1821 on Briggs Lane in Norwich, which was named after the former mayor of Norwich Augustine Briggs. Today, the street is known as Brigg Street. Woodward was the second son of Samuel Woodward, a clerk at Gurney's Bank, geologist, and antiquary. At the age of seven, Woodward was placed at the priory school at Greyfriars in Norwich.

In 1845, S. P. Woodward became the professor of geology and natural history in the Royal Agricultural College, Cirencester. On 29 November, 1845, the council of the Botanical Society of London appointed him local secretary for the county of Gloucester. Also in 1845, Woodward married Elizabeth Teulon, the eldest daughter of John Teulon. Woodward's father-in-law John Teulon may have been the printer who was sentenced on 26 October 1838 "to fifteen months imprisonment for attempting to extort money from the Duke of Devonshire, by the pamphlet entitled 'The Secret History,' relating to the late Lady Mary Hill", who accidentally burned to death at her home at the age of 85.

In 1848 he was appointed assistant in the department of geology and mineralogy in the British Museum.

He was author of A Manual of the Mollusca (in three parts, 1851, 1853 and 1856).

He proposed the term Bernician Series for the lower portion of the Carboniferous System, below the Millstone Grit.

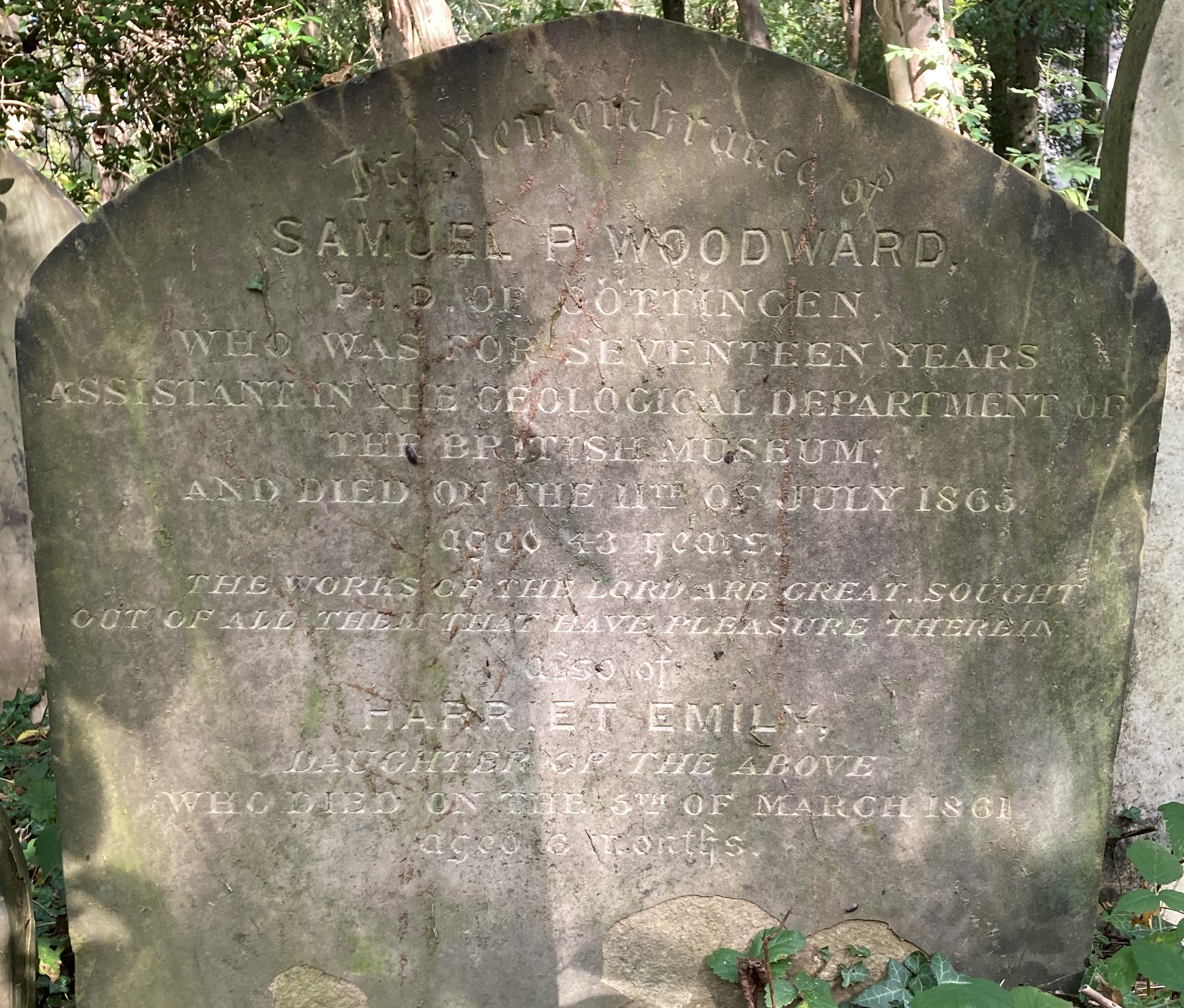
Grave of Samuel Pickworth Woodward in Highgate Cemetery

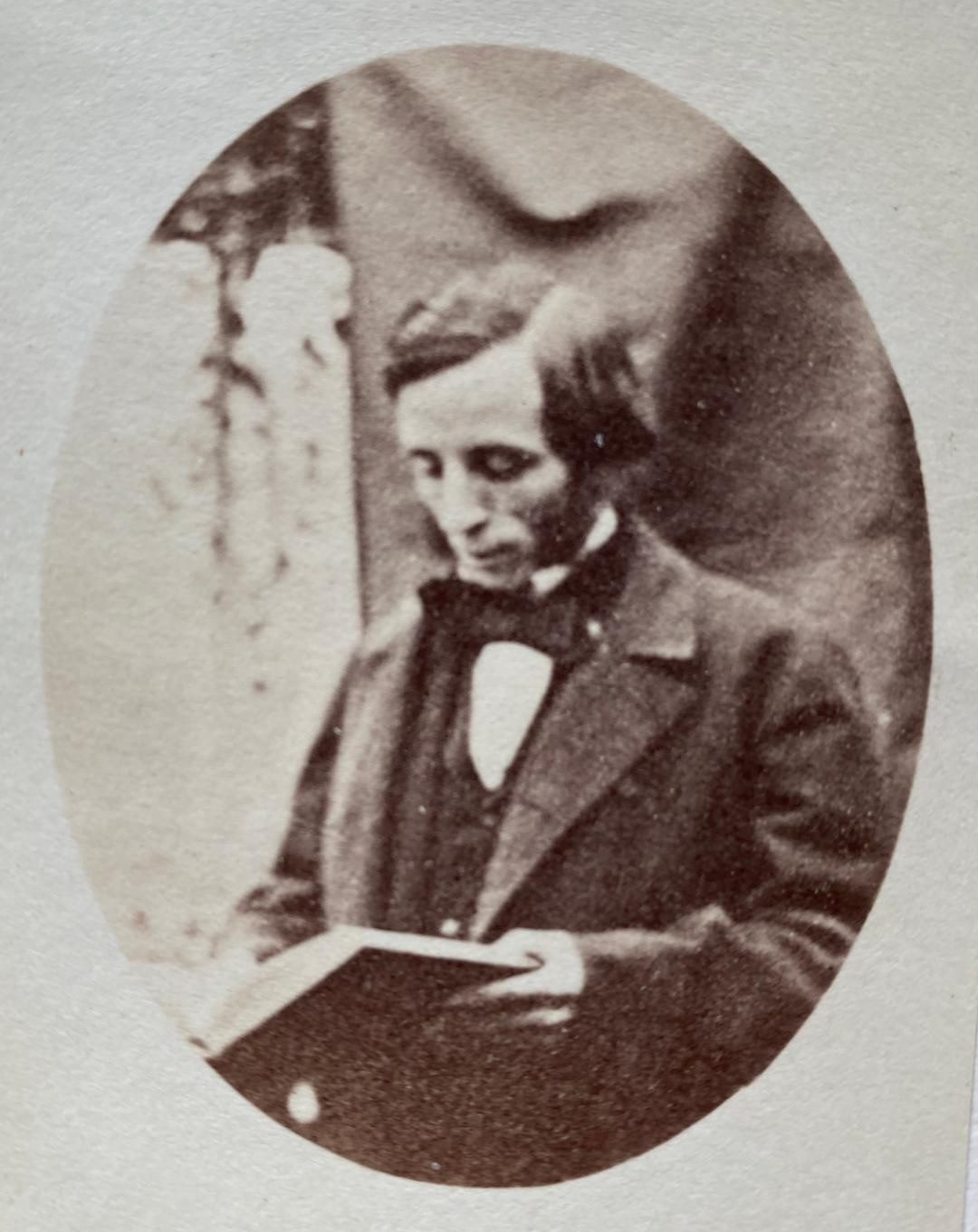
Samuel Pickworth Woodward

In early 1865 Woodward's frequent asthma attacks led him to go on sick leave. He later went to Herne Bay in hopes of recuperating his health. He died on 11 July 1865, after rupturing an artery in his lung. Woodward was buried on the eastern side of Highgate Cemetery.

Woodwardite, a hexagonal mineral containing aluminum, copper, hydrogen, oxygen, and sulphur, was described as a new mineral species by Church (1866) and named in honour Samuel Pickworth Woodward; its (type locality was given only as Cornwall.

== Family ==
His son Bernard Henry Woodward moved to Australia and was a museum director of the Western Australian Museum. His other son Horace Bolingbroke Woodward was president of the Geologists' Association from 1893–1894. His nephew Bernard Barham Woodward was a British malacologist and a member of staff at the British Museum and the Natural History Museum.

== Bibliography ==
- A Manual of the Mollusca (in three parts, 1851, 1853 and 1856).
- (in French) Fischer P., Oehlert P. & Woodward S. P. (1885-1887). Manuel de conchyliologie et de paléontologie conchyliologique ou histoire naturelle des mollusques vivants et fossiles suivi d'un appendice sur les brachipodes. Avec 23 planches contenant 600 figures et 1138 gravures dans le texte. pp. I-XXIV, pp. 1–1369, Plates I-XXIII, 1 map. Paris.
