= John Augustus Fuller =

British Army general

General John Augustus Fuller CIE
- The grave of John Augustus Fuller in Brookwood Cemetery
- Born: 18 July 1828
- Died: 6 October 1902 (aged 74); London
- Military career
- Allegiance: United Kingdom
- Branch: British Army
- Service years: 1846–1883
- Rank: General
- Awards: Companion of the Order of the Indian Empire

General John Augustus Fuller, CIE (18 July 1828 – 6 October 1902) was a British Army officer.

== Career ==
Fuller was the eldest son of Rev. Robert Fitzherbert Fuller, rector of Chalvington, Sussex. He joined the Royal Engineers in 1846 and served in the Second Anglo-Sikh War (1848–1849), including at the siege and surrender of Multan, during which he was severely wounded by an explosion in the town.

He served as political agent in Kolhapur State for some time, and was then attached to the Public Works Department in Bombay Presidency from 1850 to 1882. He was promoted to general on 1 June 1883, and retired on a pension later that year.

He died at his residence in London on 6 October 1902 and was buried in Brookwood Cemetery.
