= Samuel Maunder =

Samuel Maunder (1785 – 30 April 1849) was an English writer and composer of many works. He married a sister of William Pinnock, the author of numerous catechisms and educational works. Maunder was the author of several books, most notably The Biographical Treasury.

== Life ==
He belonged to a Devon family settled near Barnstaple. His sister married William Pinnock, the well-known projector of the educational Catechisms, which were published in eighty-three parts between 1837 and 1849. Maunder took part in their preparation, although only Pinnock's name appears on their title-page. The two were also partners in a publishing business in London, and published for two or three years the Literary Gazette.

Under his own name Maunder compiled and issued numerous dictionaries, chiefly for educational purposes. He died at his house in Gibson Square, Islington, on 30 April 1849.

== Works ==
- The Scientific and Literary Treasury (London 1843)
- Treasury of Natural History (London 1852)
- The biographical treasury, a dictionary of universal biography (London 1854)
- The History of the World: Comprising a General History, Both Ancient and Modern, of All the ..., Volume I Volume II (New York 1856–1862)
- The treasury of knowledge and library of reference (London 1859)
- Treasury of History (London 1864)
- "Universal Class Book"
