= Geological Magazine =

- Discipline: Earth sciences
- Language: English

Publication details
- History: 1864 to present
- Publisher: Cambridge University Press (United Kingdom)
- Frequency: Bimonthly

Standard abbreviations
- ISO 4: Geol. Mag.

Indexing
- ISSN: 0016-7568

Links
- Journal homepage; Cambridge University Press page

The Geological Magazine is a peer-reviewed scientific journal established in 1864, covering the earth sciences. It publishes original scientific research papers on geological topics. The journal is published bimonthly by Cambridge University Press.
