= Woodward (surname) =

Woodward is a surname.

== People with the name ==
Notable people with the name Woodward include:

=== Actors ===
- Adam Woodward (born 1992), British actor
- Edward Woodward (1930–2009), British actor
- Henry Woodward (English actor) (1714–1777), English actor
- Joanne Woodward (born 1930), American actress
- Jonathan M. Woodward (born 1973), American actor
- Morgan Woodward (1925–2019), American actor
- Peter Woodward (born 1956), British actor
- Pollyanna Woodward (born 1982), British television presenter
- Sarah Woodward (born 1963), British actress
- Shannon Woodward (born 1984), American actress
- Tim Woodward (1953–2023), British actor

=== Architects ===
- Benjamin Woodward (1816–1861), Irish architect
- Robert Woodward (architect) (1923–2010), Australian architect

=== Art, literature, music ===
- Alice B. Woodward (1862–1951), British illustrator
- Alun Woodward (born 1971), Scottish singer-songwriter known as Lord Cut-Glass
- Anna Woodward (1868–1935), American painter
- Antony Woodward (born 1963), British writer
- Buddy Woodward (born 1963) American musician, composer, singer, actor, and anime voice performer; member of The Dixie Bee-Liners and The Kingston Trio
- Caroline Marshall Woodward (1828–1890), American author
- George Moutard Woodward (1760–1809), British amateur painter and caricaturist
- George Ratcliffe Woodward (1848–1934), English composer
- Gerard Woodward (born 1961), British novelist and poet
- J. K. Woodward, American comic book artist
- John Douglas Woodward (1846–1924), American landscape artist
- Keren Woodward (born 1961), British singer and songwriter; member of Bananarama
- Lydia Woodward, American television writer and producer
- Lucy Woodward (born 1977), English-American singer/songwriter
- Mabel May Woodward (1877–1945), American painter and art educator
- Richard Woodward (organist) (1743–1777), organist of Christ Church Cathedral, Dublin
- Richard B. Woodward, arts critic for The New York Times
- Roger Woodward (born 1944), Australian pianist
- Tom Jones (born 1940, birth name Thomas Jones Woodward), Welsh singer
- William Woodward (artist) (1859–1939), American artist and educator

=== Business and finance ===
- Allen Harvey Woodward (1876–1950), American businessman and baseball team owner
- Charles A. Woodward (1852–1937), Canadian merchant, founder of the Woodward's Department Stores chain
- Charles N. "Chunky" Woodward (1924–1990), Canadian merchant and rancher, son of William Culham Woodward and grandson of Charles A. Woodward, long-time owner of the Douglas Lake Ranch
- Ed Woodward (born 1971), British Accountant and vice chairman of Manchester United F.C.
- Emerson Francis Woodward (1879–1943), American oilman
- James T. Woodward (1837–1910), American banker and owner of a major thoroughbred horse dynasty
- William Woodward Sr. (1876–1953), American banker and horse breeder
- William Woodward Jr. (1920–1955), American banker and "The Shooting of the Century" victim
- William Culham Woodward (1885–1957), Canadian merchant and former Lieutenant-Governor of British Columbia, son of Charles A. Woodward and father of C.N. Woodward

=== Clergy, theologians, and religious figures ===
- Richard Woodward (bishop) (1726–1794), Bishop of Cloyne in the Church of Ireland
- Thomas Best Woodward (1814–1875), Irish theologian
- Thomas Bullene Woodward, American Episcopal priest
- Thomas E. Woodward, Christian apologist

=== Government, law, and military ===
- Alfred Woodward (1913–2007), American judge; father of Bob Woodward
- Asa Woodward, (1830–1921), American politician from Connecticut
- Augustus B. Woodward (1774–1827), first Chief Justice of the Michigan Territory
- Barbara Woodward (born 1961), British diplomat and China expert
- Benjamin Woodward (New York politician) (1780–1841), New York politician
- Charles Edgar Woodward (1876–1942), US federal judge and former Attorney General of Illinois
- Edward Woodward (judge) (1928–2010), Australian judge and Royal Commissioner
- Eric Woodward (1899–1967), Governor of New South Wales, Australia
- George Washington Woodward (1809–1875), US Representative from Pennsylvania
- James G. Woodward (1840–1923), American newspaperman and politician, four-term mayor of Atlanta, Georgia
- John Woodward (lawyer) (1934–2022), Australian lawyer and Environmental Commissioner
- Joseph A. Woodward (1806–1885), US Representative from South Carolina
- Maud Woodward (1885–1965), American politician
- Neil Woodward (born 1962), US Navy officer and former astronaut
- Oliver Woodward (1885–1966), Australian metallurgist and World War I soldier
- Orpheus S. Woodward (1837–1919), American Union Civil War brevet brigadier general
- Peter Woodward (politician) (died 1685), American politician
- Philip Woodward (judge) (1912–1997), Australian judge and Royal Commissioner
- Sandy Woodward (1932–2013), British admiral
- Shaun Woodward (born 1958), British politician
- Stanley Woodward (political aide) (1899–1992), American diplomat
- Stanley Woodward (attorney), American lawyer
- Vernon Crompton Woodward (1916–2000), Canadian fighter pilot
- William Woodward (South Carolina politician), US Representative from South Carolina (1815–1817); father of Joseph A. Woodward
- William G. Woodward (1808–1871), Associate Justice of the Iowa Supreme Court

=== Science and academia ===
==== Biology, geography, and geology ====
- Arthur Smith Woodward (1864–1944), British paleontologist involved with the Piltdown Man
- Bernard Barham Woodward (1853–1930), British malacologist
- Bernard Henry Woodward (1846–1916), British-born naturalist and director of the Western Australian Museum
- David Woodward (cartographer) (1942–2004), English-American cartographer
- Henry Woodward (geologist) (1832–1921), British geologist and invertebrate paleontologist
- Henry Page Woodward (1858–1917), British-born Australian geologist
- Horace Bolingbroke Woodward (1848–1914), British geologist, awarded the Wollaston Medal
- John Woodward (naturalist) (1665–1728), English naturalist and geologist
- Joseph Janvier Woodward (1833–1884), American Civil War surgeon
- Samuel Woodward (1790–1838), British geologist and antiquarian
- Samuel Pickworth Woodward (1821–1865), British geologist and malacologist with the British Museum and Royal Agricultural College
- Theodore Woodward (1914–2005), American medical researcher
- Thomas Jenkinson Woodward (1745–1820), English botanist
- The Woodward brothers, John D. S. and Richard B. (c. 1848 – 1905), English missionaries and ornithologists

==== Medicine ====
- Alice Woodward Horsley (1871–1957), New Zealand doctor, the first registered woman doctor in Auckland

==== Chemistry, engineering, mathematics, and physics ====
- Carol S. Woodward, American computational mathematician
- Foster Neville Woodward FRSE (1905–1985), British chemist working on chemical weapons
- Henry Woodward (inventor) (fl. 1874), Canadian inventor involved with the incandescent bulb
- James F. Woodward (born 1941), American physicist and historian of science
- Philip Woodward (1919–2018), British mathematician, radar engineer, and horologist
- Robert Burns Woodward (1917–1979), American organic chemist; Nobel Prize winner
- Robert Simpson Woodward (1849–1921), American physicist and mathematician

==== Other academics ====
- Amanda Woodward, American psychologist and professor at University of Chicago
- C. Vann Woodward (1908–1999), American historian
- Calvin M. Woodward (1837–1914), American educator
- Donald Woodward Lee, (1910–1977), American philologist
- F. L. Woodward (1871–1952), English educator, Pali scholar and theosophist
- Joan Woodward (1916–1971), British sociologist
- Llewellyn Woodward (1890–1971), British historian
- Mark R. Woodward (born 1952), American academic

=== Sports ===
- Alan Woodward (1946–2015), English footballer
- Alex Woodward (born 1993), Australian rules footballer
- Andy Woodward (born 1973), English footballer
- Andy Woodward (chess player) (born 2010), American chess player
- Bethy Woodward (born 1992), British Paralympic athlete
- Brian Woodward (footballer) (1929–2014), English professional footballer
- Cameron Woodward (born 1985), Australian motorcycle speedway rider
- Chris Woodward (born 1976), American Major League Baseball player
- Clive Woodward (born 1956), Rugby union World Cup winning coach
- Danielle Woodward (born 1965), Australian slalom canoer
- Frank Woodward (baseball) (1894–1961), American baseball pitcher
- Frank Woodward (rugby league) (1885–1941), New Zealand rugby player
- Fred Woodward (footballer) (1899–1963), British footballer
- Gabe Woodward (born 1979), American swimmer
- Harry Woodward (footballer, born 1887) (1887 – after 1909), English footballer
- Jason Woodward (born 1990), New Zealand rugby player
- John Woodward (footballer, born 1947), English footballer
- John Woodward (footballer born 1949), Scottish former footballer
- Johnny Woodward (1924–2002), English footballer
- Nathan Woodward (born 1989), British track and field athlete
- Rob Woodward (born 1962), American baseball pitcher
- Skyler Woodward (born 1993), American pool player
- Steve Woodward (born 1947), New Zealand cricket umpire
- Vivian Woodward (1879–1954), British amateur football (soccer) player
- Viv Woodward (1914-?), Welsh professional footballer
- William Woodward (cricketer) (died 1862), English cricketer
- Woody Woodward (born 1942), American Major League Baseball player

=== Other fields ===
- Bernard Bolingbroke Woodward (1816–1869), English minister, antiquarian, and royal librarian at Windsor Castle
- Bob Woodward (born 1943), American journalist, author, and Watergate reporter
- Caroline M. Clark Woodward (1840–1924), American activist, writer
- Daphne Woodward (1906–1965), translator of French and German into English
- Ella Woodward (born 1991), British food writer
- Grace Woodward (born 1976), English fashion stylist and television presenter
- Indiana Woodward (born 1993 or 1994), French ballet dancer
- Isaac Woodard (1919–1992), American soldier and violence victim
- Louise Woodward (born 1978), British au pair implicated in a baby-shaking death in the 1990s
- Sara Griffith Stanley Woodward (1837–1918), U.S. abolitionist, author, educator
- Stanley Woodward (editor) (1895–1965), American newspaper editor and sportswriter

== Fictional characters ==
- Amanda Woodward (Melrose Place), fictional television character played by Heather Locklear
- Anthony "Tony" Woodward a.k.a. Girder, supervillain from the DC Comics universe and enemy of the Flash (Wally West)

== Lists of people with the name Woodward ==
=== By name ===
- Arthur Woodward (disambiguation)
- Bernard Woodward (disambiguation)
- Billy Woodward (disambiguation)
- Caroline M. Woodward (disambiguation)
- Charles Woodward (disambiguation)
- David Woodward (disambiguation)
- Douglas Woodward (disambiguation)
- Francis Woodward (disambiguation)
- Frank Woodward (disambiguation)
- Fred Woodward (disambiguation)
- G. M. Woodward (disambiguation)
- George Woodward (disambiguation)
- Gilbert Woodward (disambiguation)
- Harry Woodward (disambiguation)
- Henry Woodward (disambiguation)
- James Woodward (disambiguation)
- Jim Woodward (disambiguation)
- John Woodward (disambiguation)
- Joseph Woodward (disambiguation)
- Kenneth Woodward (disambiguation)
- Mabel Woodward (disambiguation)
- Michael Woodward (disambiguation)
- Richard Woodward (disambiguation)
- Robert Woodward (disambiguation)
- Samuel Woodward (disambiguation)
- Scott Woodward (disambiguation)
- Stanley Woodward (disambiguation)
- Thomas Woodward (disambiguation)
- Viv Woodward (disambiguation)
- William Woodward (disambiguation)

=== By title ===
- General Woodward (disambiguation)
- Judge Woodward (disambiguation)
- Justice Woodward (disambiguation)
- Senator Woodward (disambiguation)

== See also ==
- Woodard (disambiguation)
- Woodward (disambiguation)
- Woodyard (disambiguation)
