= John Woodward =

John Woodward or variant, may refer to:

== Sports ==
- John Woodward (English footballer) (born 1947), former footballer
- John Woodward (Scottish footballer) (born 1949), former footballer
- Johnny Woodward (1924–2002), English footballer
- John Douglas Woodward (athlete) (1925–1995), Canadian Olympic sailor
- John Woodward (rugby league), Australian rugby league player

== Arts and entertainment ==
- Jonathan M. Woodward (born 1973), U.S. actor
- John Douglas Woodward (1846–1924), American landscape artist and illustrator
- John Wesley Woodward (1879–1912), musician on the RMS Titanic
- John Collin Woodward (born 18 February 1961), former CEO of the UK Film Council and British Film Institute

== Military ==
- John B. Woodward (1835–1896), Adjutant General of New York
- Sandy Woodward (John Forster Woodward, 1932–2013), British admiral

== Others ==
- John Woodward (lawyer) (born 1934), Australian lawyer and Environmental Commissioner
- John Woodward (MP), MP for Northampton
- John Woodward (naturalist) (1665–1728), English naturalist

== See also ==
- Woodward (disambiguation)
