= Thomas Woodward =

Thomas Woodward may refer to:

- Thomas Woodward (theologian) (1814–1875), Irish theologian
- Thomas Bullene Woodward (active since 1973), American Episcopal minister
- Thomas E. Woodward (active since 1988), Christian apologist
- Tom Jones (born Thomas John Woodward), Welsh singer
- Thomas Morgan Woodward (1925–2019), American actor
- Thomas Jenkinson Woodward (1745–1820), English botanist
- Thomas Simpson Woodward (1797-1859), United States Army general
- Thomas B. Woodward, Secretary of State of Mississippi
- Thomas Woodward (footballer) (1900–1981), Welsh footballer
- Tom Woodward (1917–1994), English footballer
