= An-My Lê =

Vietnamese-American photographer

- Born: 1960 (age 65–66); Saigon, South Vietnam
- Occupation: Professor
- Known for: Photography
- Awards: MacArthur Fellowship John Simon Guggenheim Memorial Foundation

An-My Lê (born 1960) is a Vietnamese American photographer, filmmaker, author and professor at Bard College.

Her work is often focused on photographing subjects involving war, landscape, and how the two interact within military combat.

She is a 2012 MacArthur Foundation Fellow and has received the John Simon Guggenheim Memorial Foundation Fellowship (1997), the National Science Foundation Antarctic Artists and Writers Program Award (2007), and the Tiffany Comfort Foundation Fellowship (2010). Her work was included in the 2017 Whitney Biennial.

== Life and work ==
An-My Lê was born in Saigon, South Vietnam, in 1960. She fled from Vietnam in 1975, and after shuttling through military bases in the Philippines, Wake Island, Guam, finally settling in Sacramento, California, where she attended Kennedy High School . She studied biology at Stanford University, receiving her BA in 1981 and her MA in 1985. She attended Yale School of Art, receiving her MFA in photography in 1993.

In 1994, Lê visited Vietnam for the first time in almost 20 years, this is where she would capture photographs for her photo series, Viêt Nam (1994–98). Viêt Nam consists of black and white photos of a schoolgirl field worker and several captures of the landscape.

In 1999, she started her project Small Wars (1999-2002). Lê took various shots of action and solitude during a Vietnam War re-enactment, and as a condition for photographing the "battles", she was required to participate herself, assuming the role of a Viet Cong sniper.

Lê then began her work on 29 Palms (2003–04), the site of production being a Marine Corps Air Ground Combat Center in California, where training and preparation of American troops take place. Lê had the opportunity to capture the rehearsals that on at the center during America's military preparation for the wars in Iran and Afghanistan.

Her book Small Wars was published in 2005. In November 2014, her second book, Events Ashore, was published by Aperture. Events Ashore depicts a 9-year photographic exploration of the US Navy working throughout the world. The project began when the artist was invited to photograph US naval ships preparing for deployment to Iraq, the first in a series of visits to battleships, humanitarian missions in Africa and Asia, training exercises, and scientific missions in the Arctic and Antarctic.

In 2006, Lê created Trap Rock, a project commissioned for the Dia Art Foundation, where she photographed a rock quarry North of New York City.

Since 2015, she has been expanding on her newest project, Silent General (2015-) which reflects the current climate and culture within American politics and society. This project was prompted by the 2015 mass church shooting in Charleston, South Carolina, and ties in historic and contemporary issues such as the Civil War, racial tension, and the erasure of history are prevalent throughout the series.

== Awards and grants ==
- 1993: Blair Dickinson Memorial Award, Yale University School of Art
- 1995: CameraWorks Inc. fellowship
- 1996: New York Foundation for the Arts fellowship in photography
- 1997: John Simon Guggenheim Memorial Foundation fellowship
- 2004: John Gutmann Photography Fellowship
- 2007: National Science Foundation, Antarctic Artists and Writers Program Award
- 2010: Tiffany Comfort Foundation
- 2012: John D. and Catherina T. MacArthur Foundation Fellowship

== Books ==
- Small Wars. New York: Aperture, 2005. Essay by Richard B. Woodward. Interview by Hilton Als.
- Events Ashore. New York: Aperture, 2014. Essay by Geoff Dyer.
- An-My Lê: On Contested Terrain. New York: Aperture, 2020.
- An-My Lê: Between Two Rivers. New York: The Museum of Modern Art, 2023

== Selected Exhibitions ==
- 2017. Whitney Biennial
- 2020-2021. An-My Lê: On Contested Terrain, Carnegie Museum of Art
- 2023-2024. An-My Lê: Between Two Rivers/Giữa hai giòng sông/Entre deux rivières, Museum of Modern Art, New York
