= Stanley Woodward =

Stanley Woodward may refer to:

== People ==
- Stanley Woodward (political aide) (1899–1992), American political aide and diplomat
- Stanley Woodward Jr., American attorney, 20th (current) United States Associate Attorney General
- Stanley Woodward (editor) (1895–1965), American newspaper editor
- Sara Griffith Stanley Woodward (1837–1918), U.S. abolitionist, author, educator
