= Richard Woodward =

Richard Woodward may refer to:

- Richard Woodward (bishop) (1726–1794), Bishop of Cloyne in the Church of Ireland
- Richard Woodward (organist) (1743–1777), organist of Christ Church Cathedral, Dublin
- Richard B. Woodward, arts critic for The New York Times
- Richard Woodward (tavern owner), proprietor of the Woodward Tavern
