= David Woodward =

David Woodward may refer to:

- David Woodward (cartographer) (1942–2004), English-American cartographer
- David Woodward (economist) (born 1959), British economist
- Dave Woodward (born 1976), American politician
- David J. Woodward (1864–1925), of the David J. and May Bock Woodward House

== See also ==
- David Woodard (born 1964), American conductor and writer
