= Old Faithful =

Cone geyser in Yellowstone National Park

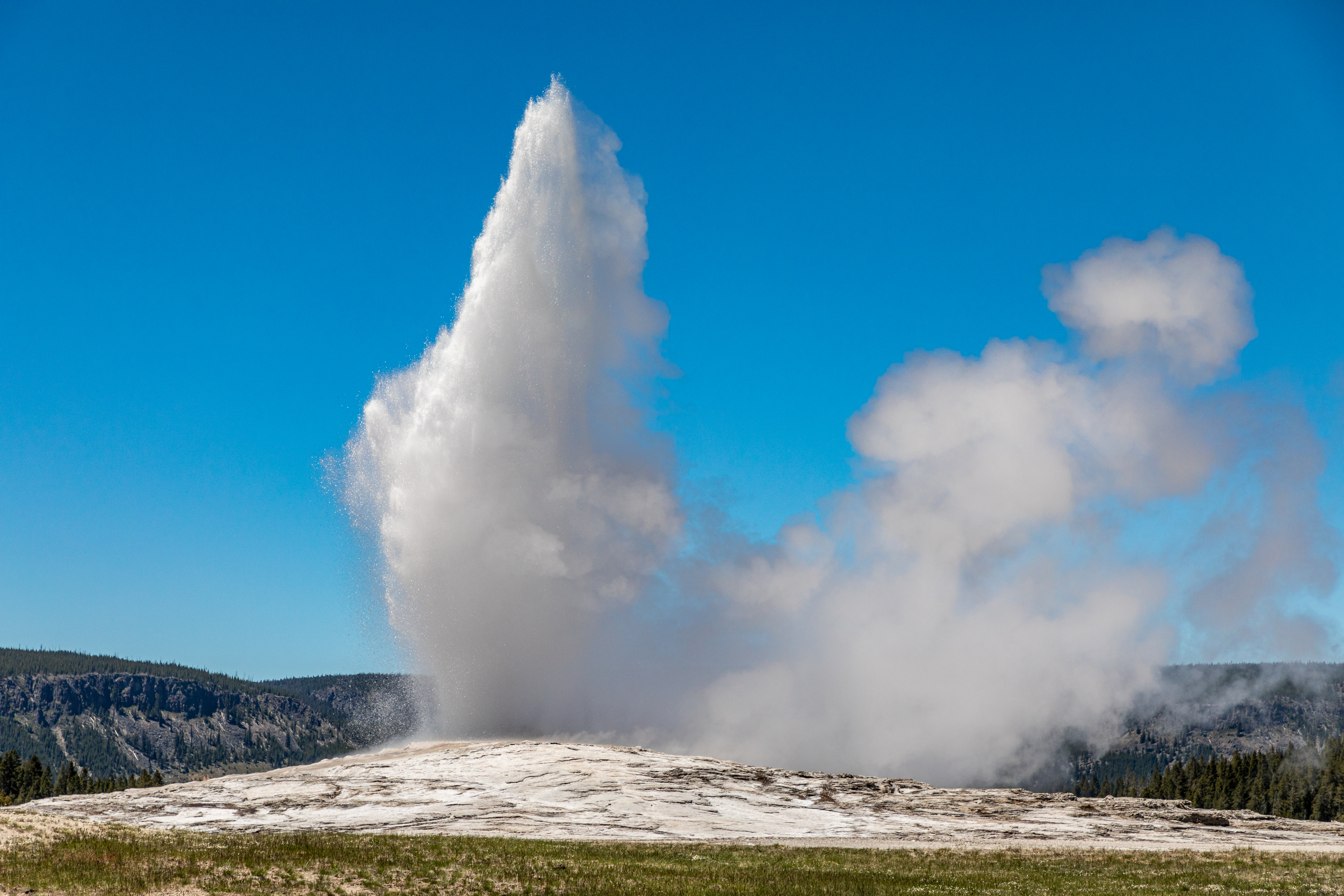
- Old Faithful erupting in 2022
- Interactive map of Old Faithful
- Name origin: Named by Henry D. Washburn; September 18, 1870; 156 years ago
- Location: Upper Geyser Basin; Yellowstone National Park; Teton County, Wyoming, U.S.
- Coordinates: 44°27′38″N 110°49′41″W
- Elevation: 7,349 ft (2,240 m)
- Type: Cone geyser
- Eruption height: 106 to 185 ft (32 to 56 m)
- Frequency: 44 to 120 minutes
- Duration: 1½ to 5 minutes
- Discharge: 3,700–8,400 US gal (14,000–32,000 L); average 27.9 ± 9.4 m^{3} (990 ± 330 cu ft)

Old Faithful is a cone geyser in Yellowstone National Park in Wyoming, United States. It was named in 1870 during the Washburn–Langford–Doane Expedition and was the first geyser in the park to be named. It is a highly predictable geothermal feature, erupting on average every 92 minutes, with the period between eruptions ranging from as short as 35 minutes to as long as 120 minutes. The geyser and the nearby Old Faithful Inn are part of the Old Faithful Historic District.

== History ==
In the afternoon of September 18, 1870, the members of the Washburn-Langford-Doane Expedition traveled down the Firehole River from the Kepler Cascades and entered the Upper Geyser Basin. The first geyser that they saw was Old Faithful. Nathaniel P. Langford wrote in his 1871 Scribner's account of the expedition:

It spouted at regular intervals nine times during our stay, the columns of boiling water being thrown from ninety to one hundred and twenty-five feet at each discharge, which lasted from fifteen to twenty minutes. We gave it the name of "Old Faithful."

— Nathaniel P. Langford, 1871

In the early days of the park, Old Faithful was often used as a laundry. As detailed in an 1883 Yellowstone guidebook:

Old Faithful is sometimes degraded by being made a laundry. Garments placed in the crater during quiescence are ejected thoroughly washed when the eruption takes place. Gen. Sheridan's men, in 1882, found that linen and cotton fabrics were uninjured by the action of the water, but woolen clothes were torn to shreds.

== Eruptions ==
Part of an eruption

More than 1,000,000 eruptions have been recorded. Harry Woodward first described a mathematical relationship between the duration and intervals of the eruptions in 1938. Old Faithful is not the tallest or largest geyser in the park; those titles belong to the less predictable Steamboat Geyser. The reliability of Old Faithful can be attributed to the fact that it is not connected to any other thermal features of the Upper Geyser Basin.

Eruptions can shoot 3,700 to 8,400 US gallons (14,000 to 32,000 L) of boiling water to a height of 106 to 185 feet (32 to 56 m) lasting from 1½ to 5 minutes. The average height of an eruption is 145 feet (44 m). Intervals between eruptions have ranged from 34 to 125 minutes, averaging 66½ minutes in 1939, slowly increasing to an average of 90 minutes apart since 2000, which may be the result of earthquakes affecting subterranean water levels. The disruptions have made earlier mathematical relationships inaccurate, but have actually made Old Faithful more predictable in terms of its next eruption. After the Borah Peak earthquake in central Idaho in October 1983, the eruption intervals of Old Faithful were noticeably lengthened.

Waiting time between eruptions and the duration of the eruption for Old Faithful

The time between eruptions has a bimodal distribution, with the mean interval being either 65 or 91 minutes, and is dependent on the length of the prior eruption. Within a margin of error of ±10 minutes, Old Faithful will erupt either 65 minutes after an eruption lasting less than 2½ minutes, or 91 minutes after an eruption lasting more than 2½ minutes.

== Measurement ==
Between 1983 and 1994, four probes containing temperature and pressure measurement devices and video equipment were lowered into Old Faithful. The probes were lowered as deep as 72 feet (22 m). Temperature measurements of the water at this depth were 244 °F (118 °C), the same as was measured in 1942. The video probes were lowered to a maximum depth of 42 feet (13 m) to observe the conduit formation and the processes that took place in the conduit. Some of the processes observed include fog formation from the interaction of cool air from above mixing with heated air from below, the recharge processes of water entering into the conduit and expanding from below, and entry of superheated steam measuring as hot as 265 °F (129 °C) into the conduit. In 2025, measurements of water discharge were carried out; it was determined that the average volume erupted is 27.9 ± 9.4 m^{3}. These measurements also allowed the calculation of heat flow of 2.2 to 2.4 MW, and an average annual discharge of chloride (63 tons), fluoride (3.9 tons), and arsenic (241 kg).

== Gallery ==
Images of Old Faithful Geyser
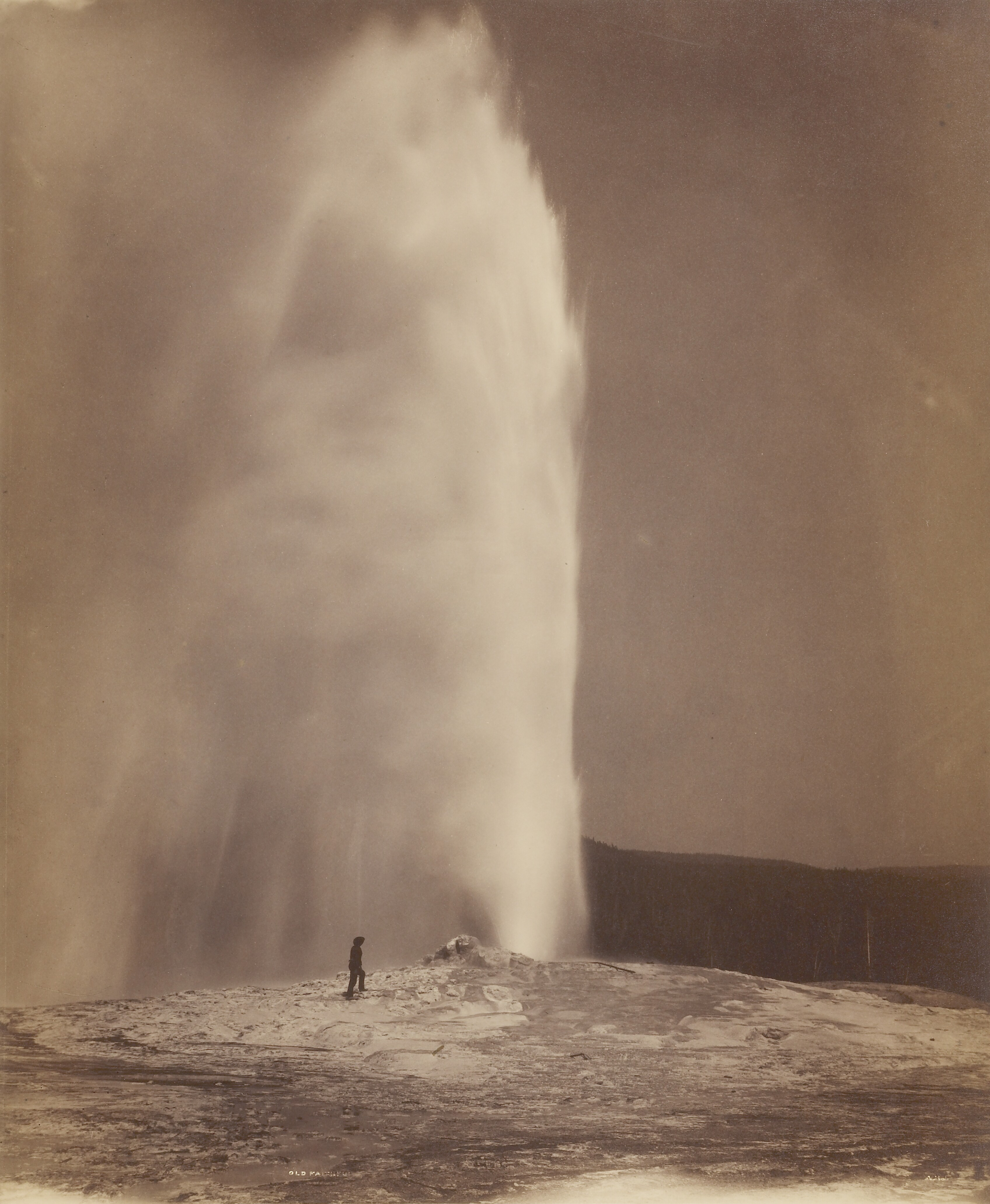
An eruption in 1870 photographed by William Henry Jackson

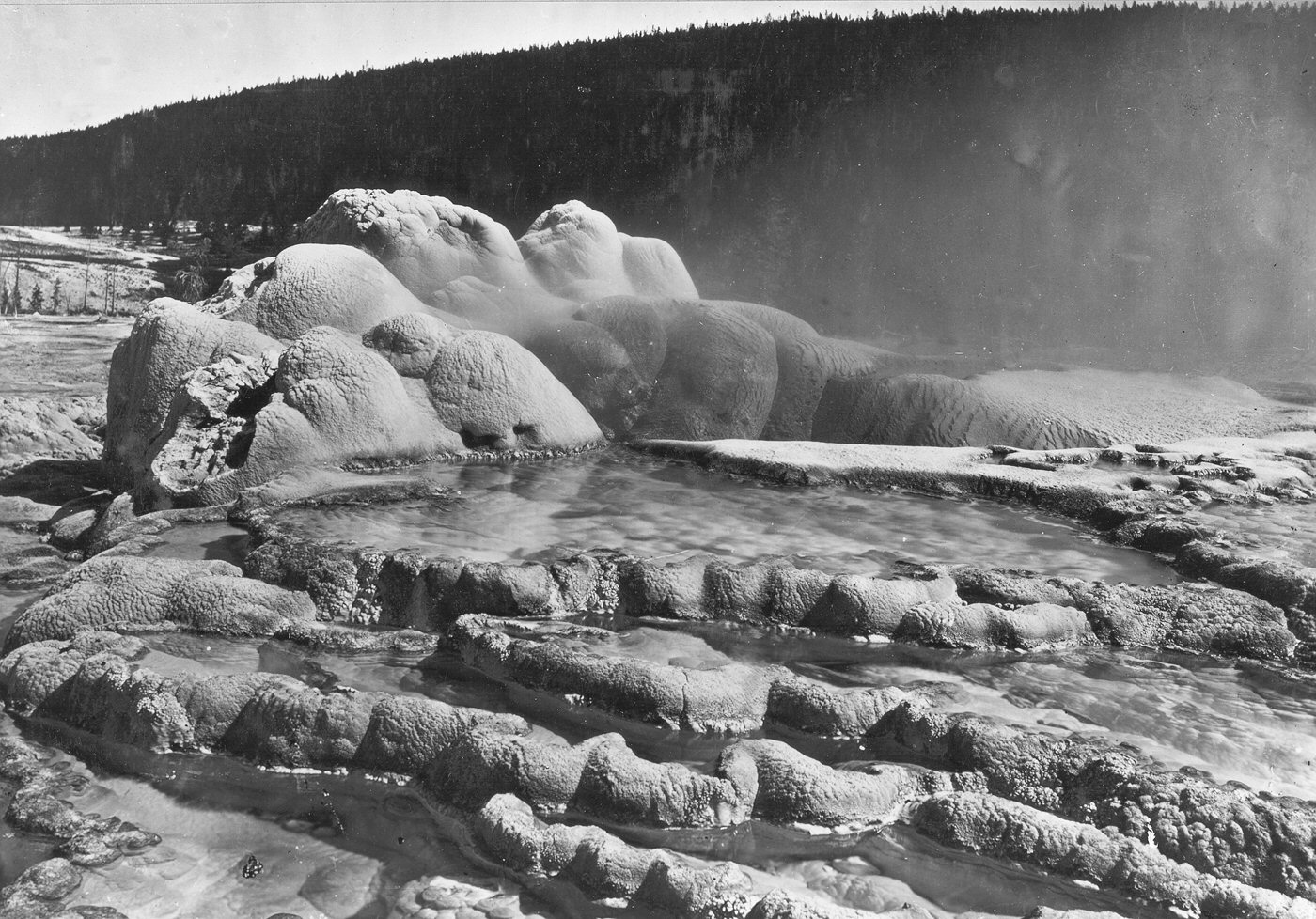
Old Faithful Crater, 1872 William Henry Jackson

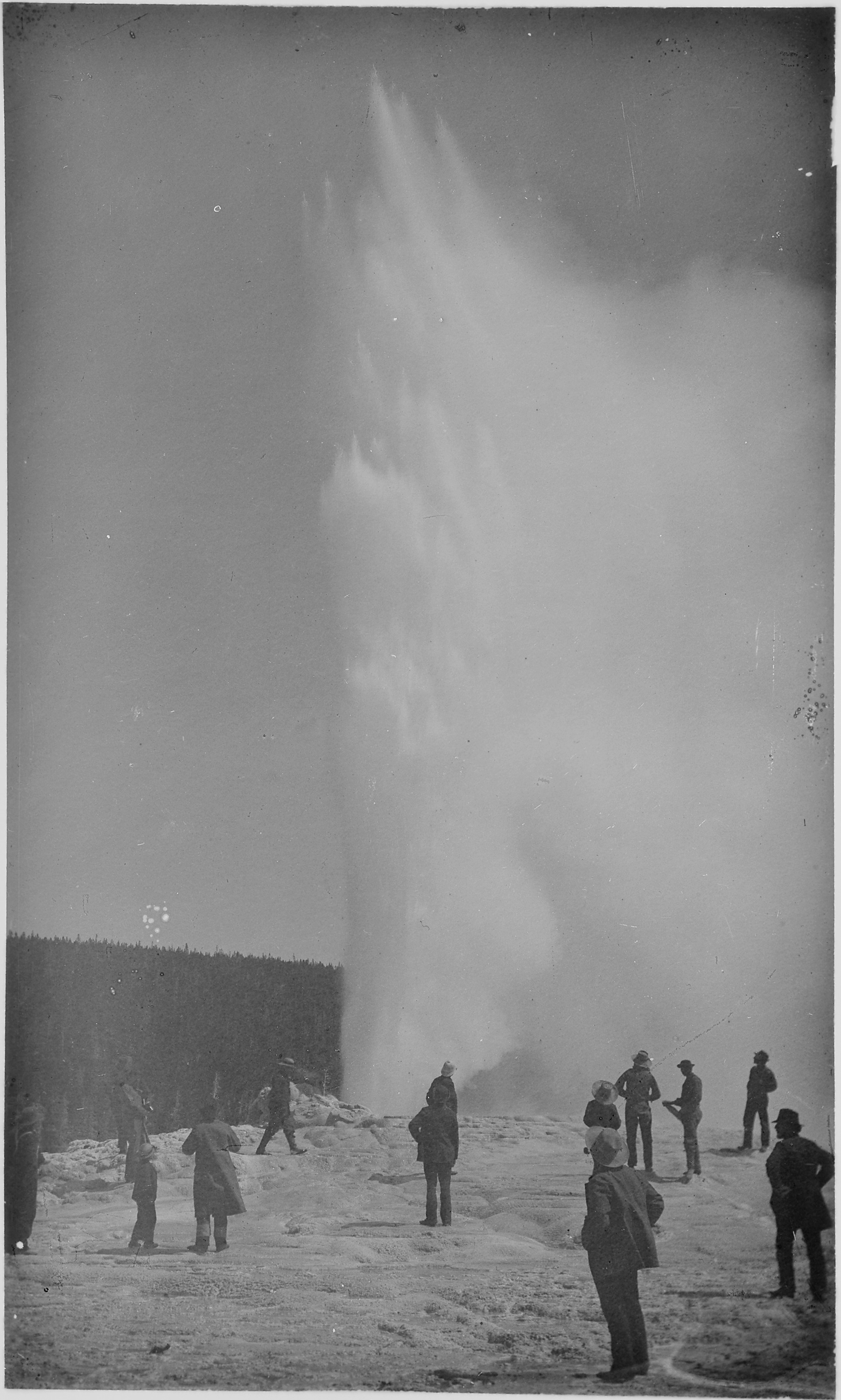
From the 1878 U.S. Geological and Geographic Survey of the Territories

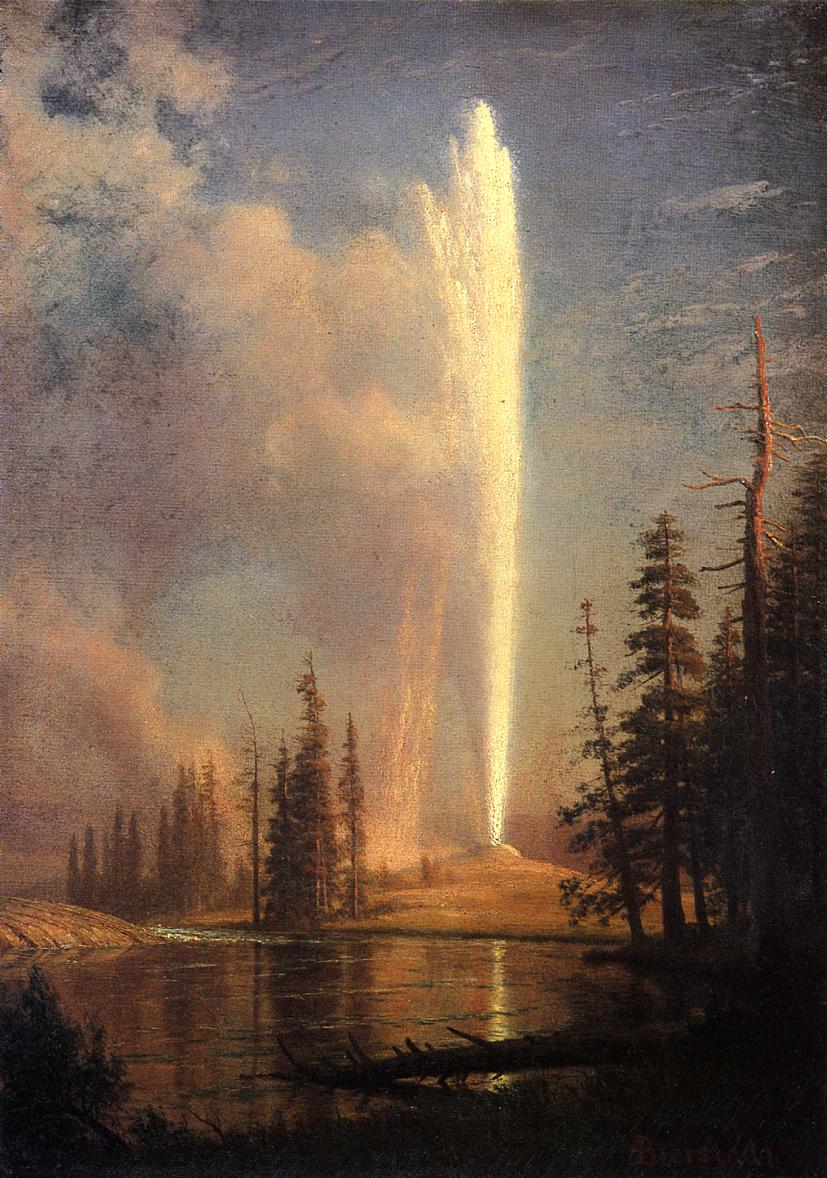
Painting by Albert Bierstadt, circa 1881

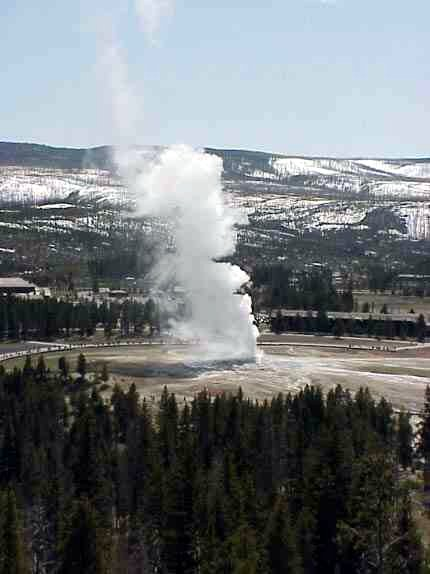
From Observation Point, 2003

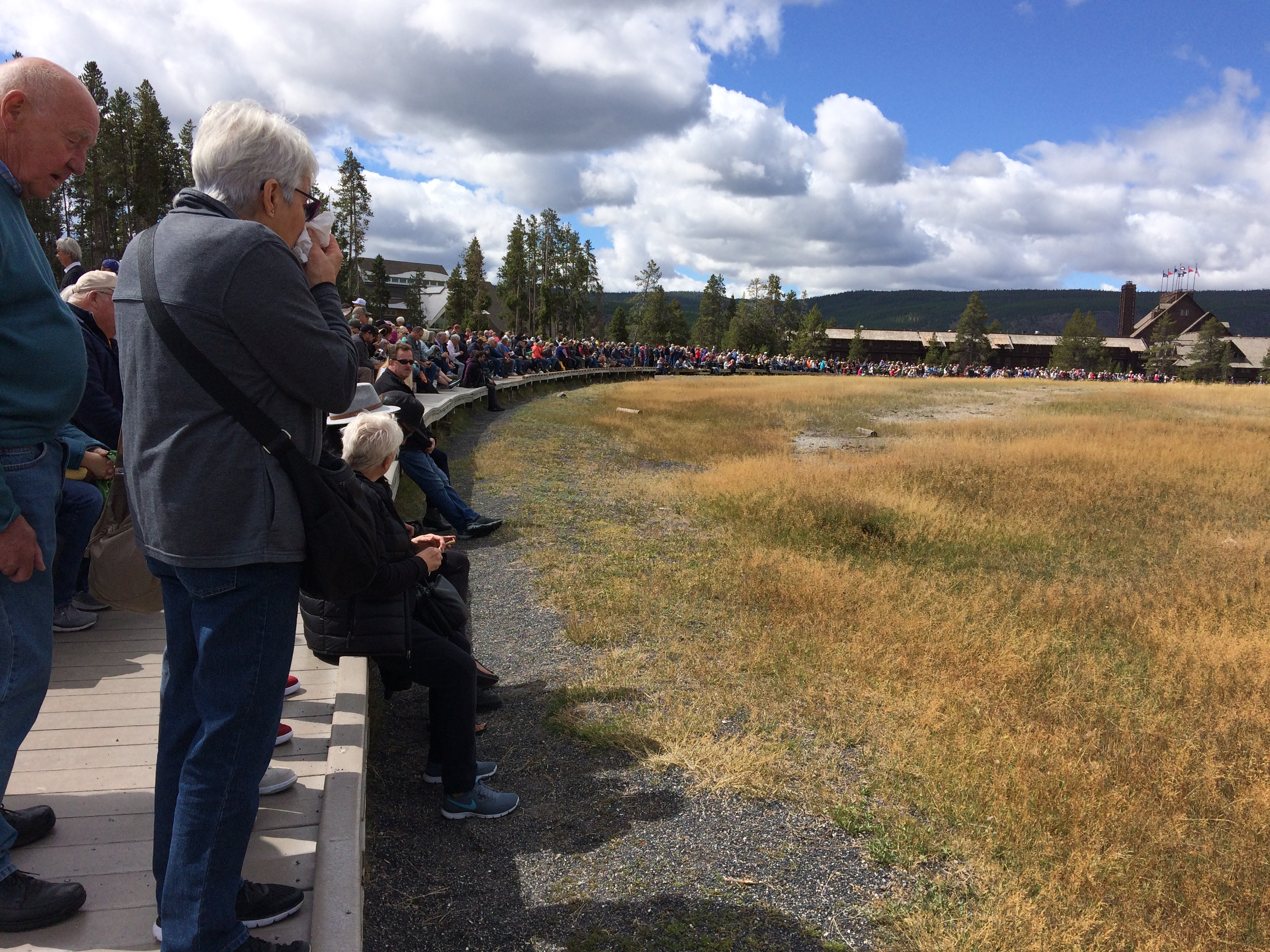
Spectators gathering to watch the geyser at Yellowstone National Park, 2019

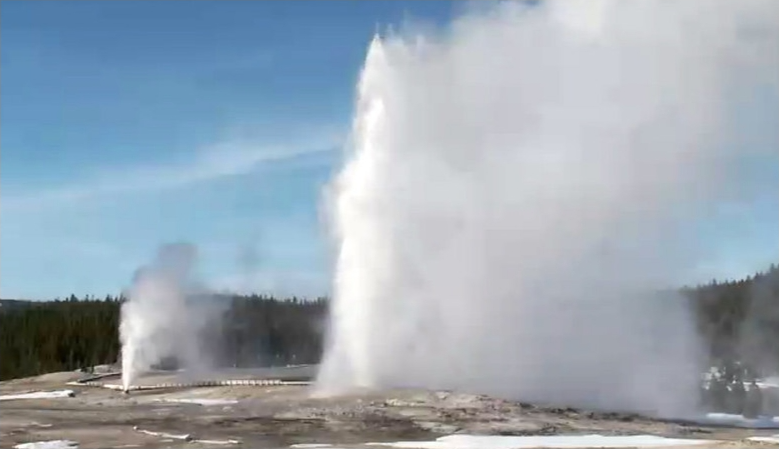
On rare occasions, the Beehive Geyser (seen in the distance) will synchronize eruptions with the larger nearby Old Faithful.

== See also ==
- Geysir
- Strokkur, another naturally occurring geyser known for erupting frequently and predictably.
- Steamboat Geyser, the largest geyser in Yellowstone
- Waimangu Geyser, the largest geyser in the world, until it became extinct in 1908
