= Bernard Woodward =

Bernard Woodward may refer to:

- Bernard Barham Woodward (1853–1930), British malacologist, son of Samuel Pickworth Woodward
- Bernard Bolingbroke Woodward (1816–1869), British minister and librarian, brother of Samuel Pickworth Woodward
- Bernard Henry Woodward (1846–1916), British-born Australian museum director, son of Samuel Pickworth Woodward

== See also ==
- Woodward (surname)
