= Arthur Woodward =

Arthur Woodward may refer to:

- Arthur Smith Woodward (1864–1944), English palaeontologist
- Arthur Woodward (footballer) (1906–1984), English professional footballer
- Arthur C. Woodward (1883–1950), minor league baseball player and American football and basketball coach
