= Kenneth Woodward =

Kenneth or Ken Woodward may refer to:

- Kenneth Woodward (cricketer), English cricketer
- Kenneth L. Woodward, American Roman Catholic writer
- Ken Woodward (health and safety), awarded an OBE for work in health and safety
- Ken Woodward (footballer), English footballer
