= Caroline M. Woodward =

Caroline M. Woodward may refer to:

- Caroline M. Clark Woodward (1840–1924), American temperance worker
- Caroline Marshall Woodward (1828–1890), American author
