= Fred Woodward =

Fred Woodward may refer to:

- Fred Woodward (footballer) (1899–1963), English footballer
- Fred Woodward (actor) (1882–1960), Canadian actor
- Freddie Woodward (born 1995), British diver
