= General Woodward =

General Woodward may refer to:

- Daniel P. Woodward (fl. 1980s–2009s), U.S. Air Force brigadier general
- Eric Woodward (1899–1967), Australian Army lieutenant general
- George A. Woodward (1835–1916), U.S. Army brigadier general
- Gilbert H. Woodward (1916–1973), U.S. Army lieutenant general
- Margaret H. Woodward (born 1960), U.S. Air Force major general
- Thomas Simpson Woodward (1797–1859), U.S. Army general
