= Douglas Woodward =

Douglas Woodward may refer to:

- Doug Woodward (American football) (born 1958), American football quarterback
- John Douglas Woodward (1846–1924), American illustrator
- Doug Woodward (sailor) (John Douglas Woodward, 1925–1995), Canadian Olympic sailor
