= Gilbert Woodward =

Gilbert Woodward may refer to:

- Gilbert M. Woodward (1835-1913), United States Representative from Wisconsin
- Gilbert H. Woodward (1917-1973), United States Army Lieutenant General
