= William Woodward =

William Woodward may refer to:

== Politicians ==
- William Woodward (South Carolina politician), U.S. Representative from South Carolina
- William Culham Woodward (1885–1957), Lieutenant Governor of British Columbia
- William Woodward (MP) for Dunwich
- William G. Woodward (1808–1871), Justice of the Iowa Supreme Court and state senator

== Others ==
- William Woodward (fl. 1851), English pharmacist who invented gripe water
- William Woodward (cricketer) (died 1862), English cricketer
- William Woodward (artist) (1859–1939), American artist and educator
- William Creighton Woodward (1866–1949), American doctor and lawyer
- William Woodward Sr. (1876–1953), American banker and owner of Belair Stud
- William Woodward (rower) (1920–1987), British Olympic rower
- William Woodward Jr. (Billy, 1920–1955), banker and "The Shooting of the Century" victim
- William Woodward (artist, born 1935) (1935–2023), American painter and muralist
- William E. Woodward (1874–1950), American author

== See also ==
- Billy Woodward (disambiguation)
- William Woodward House, Massachusetts
