= Harry Woodward =

Harry Woodward may refer to:

- Harry Woodward (naturalist), US ranger and naturalist
- Harry Woodward (footballer, born 1887) (1887–?), English footballer who played as a full-back
- Harry Woodward (footballer, born 1919) (1919–1984), English football who played as a centre half
- Harry Page Woodward (1858–1917), Australian geologist, mining engineer and public servant
- Harry "Woody" Woodward, character in EastEnders

== See also ==
- Henry Woodward (disambiguation)
