= Robert Woodward =

Robert, Rob or Bob Woodward may refer to:

== Entertainment ==
- Bob Woodward (actor) (1907–1972), American in Western bit parts
- Robert Woodward, English frontman for 1970s band Lieutenant Pigeon

== Politics and government ==
- Robert F. Woodward (1908–2001), American ambassador to Spain
- Robert Davidson Woodward (1909–1982), American member of the Florida House of Representatives
- Robert M. Woodward, American general and 1960s member of the Illinois House of Representatives
- Rob Woodward (politician) (born 1968/69), American Republican state senator in Colorado

== Writers ==
- Robert Simpson Woodward (1849–1924), American civil engineer, physics and mathematics writer
- Robert Burns Woodward (1917–1979), American academic, prolific organic chemistry writer
- Robert Woodward (architect) (1923–2010), Australian fountain designer and author of architectural works
- Bob Woodward (born 1943), American investigative reporter and author

== Others ==
- Robert Woodward (priest) (1653–1702), English Anglican priest
- Rob Woodward (baseball) (born 1962), American baseball pitcher
