= Ken Woodward (health and safety) =

Kenneth Woodward is a holder of the OBE for work in health and safety, which he commenced following an industrial accident, and the first person to be awarded the medal for work in that field.

== Personal life ==
Ken Woodward was born in 1950 in Birmingham, England. He is married with three boys and one girl. His youngest son, Ben Woodward, is known for his role as the London Mint General Manager on the Sky One and Direct TV show, Championship Gaming Series.

== Career and incident ==
In November 1990, Woodward – at that time employed by Coca-Cola Schweppes – was involved in a factory incident during which he inadvertently handled chemicals in a dangerous manner, as a result of his and other's failure to comply with full safety procedures, combined with poor training by their employer. The resulting explosion cost him his sight.

A subsequent investigation revealed that there had been at least two previous near misses that were not investigated properly and had been put down to operator clumsiness. A memo suggesting that the process be changed for safety reasons was still sitting on the relevant manager's desk waiting for action when this accident occurred. The reaction was traced to stabilisers in the two chemicals, that had acted as catalysts in the resulting exothermic reaction.

The company was fined, as well as taking a loss estimated at £2.6 million. The company changed their approach to safety, and following the incident, Ken became an advocate of safety standards and practices. In 2006, Kenneth Woodward was awarded the O.B.E in the Queen's Birthday Honours for services to Health and Safety.
