= Harry Woodward (naturalist) =

US ranger naturalist (fl. 1939)

Harry Woodward was a US ranger naturalist who, in 1938–9, first described a mathematical relation between the durations and intervals of eruptions from the Old Faithful Geyser. Intervals between eruptions can range from 45 to 125 minutes, averaging 66.5 minutes in 1939, slowly increasing to an average of 90 minutes apart today.
