= George Woodward =

George Woodward may refer to:

- George Woodward (diplomat) (died 1735), 18th century British diplomat in Poland
- George Washington Woodward (1809–1875), American politician
- George Ratcliffe Woodward (1848–1934), British composer
- George Murgatroyd ("Moutard") Woodward (1765–1809), English humorous author and caricaturist
- George A. Woodward (1835–1916), U.S. Army general
- George Woodward (American football) (1894–1968), American football coach
