= James Woodward =

James Woodward may refer to:

== Academics ==
- James Woodward (physicist), American physicist and historian of science
- James H. Woodward, aeronautical engineer, professor and chancellor of UNC Charlotte
- James Woodward (philosopher), American philosopher of science

== Others ==
- James G. Woodward (1845–1923), American newspaperman and politician; mayor of Atlanta, Georgia
- James T. Woodward (1837–1910), American banker and owner of a major thoroughbred horse dynasty
- James Woodward (cricketer) (born 1963), English cricketer
- Jim Woodward (politician), American politician; Idaho state senator
