= Charles Woodward =

Charles Woodward may refer to:

- Charles Edgar Woodward (1876–1942), United States federal judge and Attorney General of Illinois
- Charles A. Woodward (1842–1937), Canadian merchant, founder of the Woodward's Department Stores Limited and Member of the Legislative Assembly of British Columbia
- Chunky Woodward (Charles N. Woodward, 1924–1990), Canadian merchant and rancher, grandson of Charles A. Woodward
- Charles William Woodward (1895–1969), judge in Maryland

== See also ==
- Charles F. Woodard (1848–1907), Justice of the Maine Supreme Judicial Court
- Woodward (disambiguation)
