= Scott Woodward =

Scott Woodward may refer to:

- Scott Woodward (athletic director), collegiate athletic director
- Scott Woodward (biologist), microbiologist and molecular biologist
