= David Woodward (economist) =

British economist and economic advisor (born 1959)

- Born: 1959 (age 66–67); West Molesey, Surrey, England
- Education: University of Oxford
- Occupation: Economist
- Years active: 1982–present

David Woodward (born 1959) is a British economist and economic advisor.

== Early life and education ==
David Woodward was born in 1959 in West Molesey, Surrey.

He graduated from Keble College, Oxford in philosophy, politics and economics in 1982.

== Career ==
After graduating, he joined the Foreign and Commonwealth Office in London, where he worked as an economic advisor working on debt, structural adjustment and other development issues, with emphasis on Latin America and South East Asia.

He later spent two years in Washington, D.C., working in the office of the UK's executive director to the International Monetary Fund and the World Bank. After returning to Britain, he worked as a research coordinator on debt for Save the Children and, after several years as an independent consultant, became a policy officer for Asia for The Catholic Institute for International Relations (now Progressio). He then spent two and a half years as a development economist with the World Health Organization, and several years as an independent consultant, before joining the New Economics Foundation, where he was head of the New Global Economy Programme for three years.

He is again an independent writer and researcher, focusing primarily on global economic governance, the interface between development, the environment and health, and alternatives to the neoliberal model of development. He has also presented evidence to parliamentary committees including the House of Commons Treasury Committee, House of Commons International Development Committee, and the European Parliament.

== Books ==
- Woodward, D. (1992) Debt, Adjustment and Poverty in Developing Countries. London: Pinter Publishers/Save the Children (UK):
- Volume I: National and International Dimensions of Debt and Adjustment in Developing Countries.
- Volume II: The Impact of Debt and Adjustment at the Household Level in Developing Countries.
- Woodward, D. (2001) The Next Crisis? Direct and Equity Investment in Developing Countries. London: [Zed Books].
- Smith, R., Beaglehole, R., Woodward, D. and Drager, N. (eds.) (2003) Global Public Goods for Health: Health Economic and Public Health Perspectives. Oxford: Oxford University Press.
