= Arthur Woodward (footballer) =

English footballer

Personal information
- Date of birth: 18 November 1906
- Place of birth: Watford, England
- Date of death: 7 September 1984 (aged 77)
- Place of death: Harlesden, England
- Height: 5 ft 11 1/2 in (1.82 m)
- Position: Half back

Senior career*
Years	Team	Apps	(Gls)
1926–1945	Watford	391	(16)
- * Club domestic league appearances and goals

Arthur Woodward (18 November 1906 – 7 September 1984) was an English professional footballer. Born in Watford, Hertfordshire, Woodward spent the whole of his professional career at his hometown club. He also played for British truck manufacturer Scammell's football team during the Second World War. Woodward started his career in 1926 as a centre half and wing half, initially retiring in 1942. Player shortages prompted him to come out of retirement in 1944, and Woodward played in a variety of positions, including two full matches as a goalkeeper, before permanently retiring in 1945. He played 391 Football League games, 29 FA Cup ties, and 12 matches in the Football League Third Division South Cup, which Watford won in 1937. Woodward scored 19 goals in all competitions, and a further 3 in his 105 wartime games for the club. Woodward died in Harlesden, Greater London at the age of 77.
