= Joseph Woodward =

Joseph Woodward may refer to:

- Joseph A. Woodward (1806–1885), U.S. Representative from South Carolina
- Joseph Janvier Woodward (1833–1884), American surgeon
- Joseph Woodward (rugby union) (born 2003), English rugby union player
