= Billy Woodward =

Billy Woodward may refer to:

- William Woodward Jr. (1920–1955), heir to the Hanover National Bank fortune, shot to death by his wife
- Billy Woodward (footballer) (1907–1975), English footballer

== See also ==
- William Woodward (disambiguation)
