= Samuel Woodward (disambiguation) =

Samuel Woodward (1790–1838) was an English geologist and antiquary.

Samuel or Sam Woodward may also refer to:

- Samuel Bayard Woodward (1787–1850), American psychiatrist
- Samuel Pickworth Woodward (1821–1865), English geologist and malacologist
- Samuel Walter Woodward (1848–1917), American businessman, co-founder of the Woodward & Lothrop department store
- Samuel Woodward, 18th-century Massachusetts minister, builder of the Rev. Samuel Woodward House
- Samuel Lincoln Woodward, American neo-Nazi charged in the 2018 murder of Blaze Bernstein

== See also ==
- Sam Woodyard (1925–1988), American jazz drummer
- Samuel Woodworth (1784–1842), American author
