= William Woodward House =

Historic house in Massachusetts, United States

- U.S. National Register of Historic Places
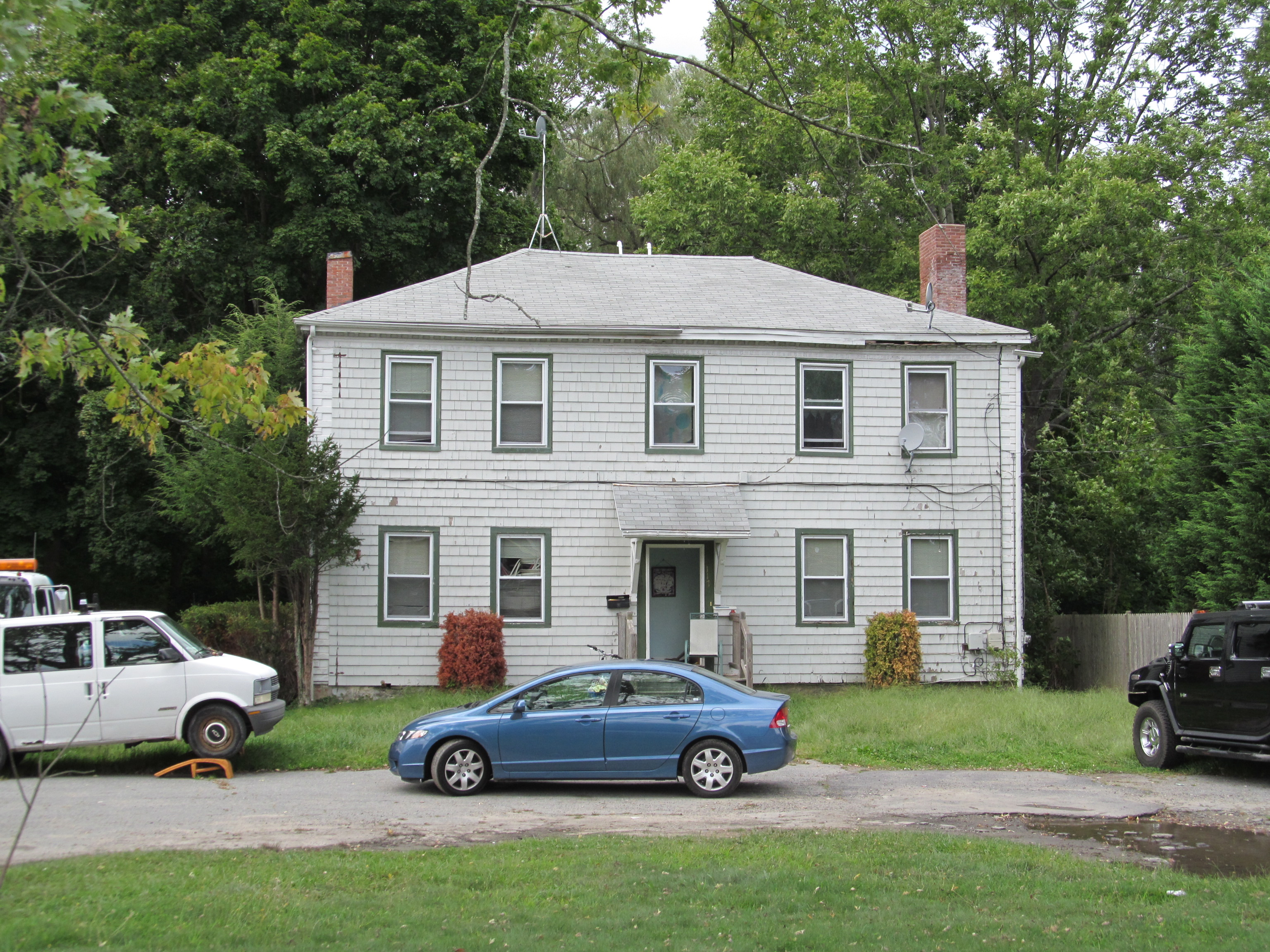
- William Woodward House

- Location within Massachusetts Location within the United States
- Location: 117 Arlington St., Taunton, Massachusetts
- Coordinates: 41°54′17″N 71°4′57″W
- Built: c. 1800
- Architectural style: Federal
- MPS: Taunton MRA
- NRHP reference No.: 85001529
- Added to NRHP: July 10, 1985

The William Woodward House is a historic house in Taunton, Massachusetts. Built about 1800, it is a prominent local example of Federal period architecture, notably in part for its brick side walls. It was listed on the National Register of Historic Places in 1985.

== Description and history ==
The William Woodward House is located east of downtown Taunton, on the west side of Arlington Street. The immediate surrounding area is mixed light industrial, commercial and residential, with a former railroad station directly across the street. It is a two-story wood-frame structure, five bays wide, with a hip roof, brick end walls, and clapboard siding on the other walls. The center entrance is sheltered by a decorative shed-roof hood dating to c. 1870. The corner boards are finished in an imitation of quoining. Windows are 1-over-1 sash set in rectangular openings set symmetrically on the front facade. Chimneys rise from each of the side walls.

The house's construction date is not known. Architectural evidence suggests it was built either in the late 18th or early 19th century, and it is a fine local example of Federal period architecture. In 1866 the house was sold to the Old Colony and Newport Railway for use as a depot until a new station was erected nearby on Dean Street in 1881. Originally oriented facing Dean Street, it was moved to its present location at a later date.

== See also ==
- National Register of Historic Places listings in Taunton, Massachusetts
