= Justice Woodward =

Justice Woodward may refer to:

- Augustus B. Woodward (1774–1827), the first chief justice of the Michigan Territory
- George Washington Woodward (1809–1875), chief justice of the Supreme Court of Pennsylvania
- Philip Woodward (judge) (1912–1997), justice of the Supreme Court of New South Wales
- William G. Woodward (1808–1871), associate justice of the Iowa Supreme Court

== See also ==
- Judge Woodward (disambiguation)
