= Judge Woodward =

Judge Woodward may refer to:

- Charles Edgar Woodward (1876–1942), judge of the United States District Court for the Northern District of Illinois
- Halbert Owen Woodward (1918–2000), judge of the United States District Court for the Northern District of Texas

== See also ==
- Justice Woodward (disambiguation)
