= Crossworld =

Christian organization

Crossworld is an international Christian missionary organization. As of 2021, Crossworld has more than 300 disciple-makers in 35 countries, who are involved in church ministry, education, healthcare, community development, refugee work, business, sports ministry and teaching English.

Founded in 1931, Crossworld is headquartered in Kansas City, Missouri. It is a registered 501(c)(3) organization and T3010 charity in the U.S. and Canada, respectively. Crossworld is an accredited member of the Evangelical Council for Financial Accountability (U.S.) and the Canadian Council of Christian Charities.

== History ==
In 1931, a group of 36 missions workers serving in the Belgian Congo and Brazil formed the Unevangelized Fields Mission (UFM). Originally headquartered in London, UK, the UFM was primarily a sending organization for missionaries. That same year, the UFM sent original group members Reverend Edwin and Lilian Pudney, who had previously served eight years in the Belgian Congo, to establish an office in Toronto, Canada. An office was also established in Australia in June 1933, and it initially sent missionaries to Papua New Guinea. In 1941, the Pudneys moved to the United States and opened a second North American office in Philadelphia, which moved in 1954 to the Philadelphia suburb of Bala Cynwyd, Pennsylvania.

Under Reverend Pudney's long tenure as General Secretary, UFM North America became the largest sending agency of the three offices. After serving in the Belgian Congo for twelve years with his wife, Jean, and leading the missionaries during the events of the 1964 Simba rebellion, Reverend Al Larson became General Secretary of UFM North America. During his twenty-five-year tenure, he had a significant influence on the shape and continued growth of UFM North America, leaving the mission with workers in 20 countries on five continents.

In 1976, the three headquarters—London, England; North America (Bala Cynwyd and Toronto); and Melbourne, Australia—agreed to become three separate missions agencies. Though legally separate organizations on three different continents, cooperation among the cross-cultural workers of these organizations has continued in various countries. At that time, the North American branch retained the name Unevangelized Fields Mission, until it became UFM International in 1980. UFM England changed its name to UFM Worldwide, and UFM Australia became the Asia Pacific Christian Mission.

UFM International grew and moved into new regions of ministry, often through mergers or absorption of smaller missions organizations. Some of these are:

- Haitian Gospel Mission (1943)
- World Christian Crusade (1949)
- Alpine Mission to France (1962)
- Egypt General Mission (1964)
- Mexican Indian Mission (1971)
- Safe Harbor Christian Servicemen’s Center (1986)
- International Asian Mission (1988)
- Berean Mission (2000)

In 1991, after serving for 17 years planting churches with Alpine Mission to France, subsequently UFM International, James H. Nesbitt served as General Director. Dr. Nesbitt helped to guide UFM into the new century as new outreach options were being explored such as business as missions.

In 2004, UFM International changed its name to Crossworld. In 2010, through a joint shared services agreement with Avant Ministries, the headquarters of Crossworld moved to Kansas City, Missouri.

In 2011, under president Dale Losch, Crossworld refreshed its vision to engage all followers of Jesus Christ in the task of making disciples. Its vision is summarized in its tagline: “All Professions. One Mission.” Losch’s book A Better Way, published in 2012, makes the case for this vision.

In June 2023, Luke Perkins was installed as Crossworld's seventh president.

== Beliefs ==
Crossworld is a nondenominational organization and holds to an evangelical statement of faith: one true God, Jesus Christ as Lord, the Holy Spirit, the authority of Scripture, total depravity of man, the necessity of salvation, and eternal life.

== Focus ==
Crossworld focuses on disciple-making, and describes its mission as “a formative community of disciple-makers from all professions bringing God’s love to life in the world’s least-reached marketplaces.” Its members work in professional settings around the world and build relationships with the people they meet in the workplace and in the community. Their goal is to “live and love like Jesus and help others to do the same.”

== Media coverage ==
In its ninety-year history, three specific events brought Crossworld into the public eye. The first was in 1935, when Fred Roberts, Fred Wright, and Fred Dawson, three UFM workers, were killed while trying to contact the Kayapó tribe in the Amazon region of Brazil. The story of the “Three Freds” was recounted in newspaper articles and books on three continents (Europe, North America, and Australia). This event inspired new missionaries to join the newly-formed organization at that time.

The second event occurred during the Simba rebellion of 1964 in the Belgian Congo (now Democratic Republic of Congo), when hundreds of people were killed by Simba rebels. Thirteen UFM workers and six of their children were killed. The UFM received worldwide coverage through newspaper articles from the United Press International and the Associated Press. These events were the featured cover story of Life magazine in December 1964. Nearly fifty years later, on November 16, 2014, some of the rebellion's surviving hostages were reunited in Miami with the Cuban soldiers who had rescued them in 1964.

In 1982, the UFM was on the cover of Time magazine, when UFM missionary Leon Dillinger was featured for his work among the Dani tribe of Irian Jaya (now Papua, Indonesia) in an article titled, “The New Missionary.”

== See also ==
Urbana (conference)
