= Henry Woodward =

Henry Woodward may refer to:

- Henry Woodward (colonist) (c. 1646–c. 1690), first British colonist of colonial South Carolina
- Henry Woodward (English actor) (1714–1777), interpreter of Parolles in All's Well That Ends Well
- Henry Woodward (geologist) (1832–1921), English geologist and president of the Geological Society of London
- Henry Woodward (inventor), Canadian inventor and pioneer in the development of the incandescent lamp
- Henry Woodward (American actor) (1882–1953), performer in The Last of the Mohicans
- Henry Woodward (Australian politician) (1898–1966), member of the New South Wales Legislative Assembly
- Harry Page Woodward (1858–1917), British-born Australian geologist, mining engineer and public servant

== See also ==
- Harry Woodward (disambiguation)
