= Francis Woodward =

Francis Woodward may refer to:

- Francis Woodward (Australian politician) (1846–1905), New South Wales politician
- Francis H. Woodward (born 1939), Massachusetts politician

== See also ==
- Frank Woodward (disambiguation)
