= Frank Woodward =

Frank Woodward may refer to:

- Frank Woodward (baseball) (1894–1961), American baseball pitcher
- Frank Woodward (rugby league) (1885-1941), New Zealand rugby league footballer
- F. L. Woodward (Frank Lee Woodward, 1871–1952), English educationist

== See also ==
- Francis Woodward (disambiguation)
