= Mabel Woodward =

Mabel Woodward may refer to:

- Mabel May Woodward (1877–1945), Rhode Island impressionist painter
- Mabel Strickland Woodward (1897–1976), rodeo performer
