= Thomas E. Woodward =

American research professor

- Born: 1950 (age 75–76)
- Education: Princeton University (BA); Dallas Theological Seminary (ThM); University of South Florida (PhD)
- Theological work
- Tradition or movement: Christian apologetics, Intelligent design movement
- Main interests: Intelligent design, evolution, apologetics, C.S. Lewis, philosophy, theology, communication theory

Thomas E. Woodward (born 1950) is an American theologist and Christian apologist. He was a professor at Trinity College of Florida and Dallas Theological Seminary

== Biography ==
Woodward earned a B.A. in history from Princeton University and a Th.M. in systematic theology from Dallas Theological Seminary. He obtained his doctorate in communications at the University of South Florida. Woodward has published works defending intelligent design and arguing against evolution. His doctoral thesis, a history of the Intelligent design movement, was published by Baker Books as "Doubts About Darwin" in 2003. His second book "Darwin Strikes Back," was released in 2006.

Woodward has maintained an evangelical teaching and discipleship ministry, including being head of the C.S.Lewis Society, which is housed at Trinity College, and director, since 1988, of Trinity College's Center for University Ministries (CFUM). Prior to this, Woodward served with UFM International ("Unevangelized Field Mission International", a missionary organization now known as Crossworld) in the Dominican Republic.

In the fall of 2006 and the spring of 2007, Woodward was adjunct faculty at the Tampa extension of the Southeastern Baptist Theological Seminary of Wake Forest, North Carolina. He taught classes in "Salvation and Religious Pluralism" and "Eschatology".

== Books ==
- Doubts about Darwin: A History of Intelligent Design, Thomas Woodward, Baker Books, June 2003, ISBN 0-8010-6443-0
- Darwin Strikes Back: Defending the Science of Intelligent Design, Thomas Woodward, Baker Books, November 1, 2006, ISBN 0-8010-6563-1
- The Mysterious Epigenome: What Lies Beyond DNA, Thomas E. Woodward, James P. Gills, Kregel Publications, January 1, 2011, ISBN 978-0-8254-4192-9

== Articles ==
- Were the Darwinists Wrong? National Geographic stacks the deck, Thomas E. Woodward, ChristianityToday, November 1, 2004
