= Viv Woodward =

Viv Woodward may refer to:

- Vivian Woodward (1879–1954), English amateur football player
- Viv Woodward (footballer, born 1914) (1914–?), Welsh football inside forward
