= G. M. Woodward =

G. M. Woodward may refer to:

- George Moutard Woodward (1760–1809), English caricaturist and humor writer
- Gertrude Mary Woodward (1854–1939), English scientific illustrator
