= Fred Woodward (footballer) =

English footballer

Personal information
- Full name: Fred Woodward
- Date of birth: October quarter 1899
- Place of birth: Ashton-under-Lyne, England
- Date of death: 15 December 1963 (aged 63–64)
- Place of death: Leigh, England
- Height: 5 ft 7 in (1.70 m)
- Position: Wing half

Youth career
- Hindley Wesleyans
- Wellington Temperance

Senior career*
Years	Team	Apps	(Gls)
1920–1921	Burnley	0	(0)
1921–1922	Wigan Borough	3	(0)
- * Club domestic league appearances and goals

Fred Woodward (1899 – 1963) was an English professional footballer who played as a wing half. He made three appearances in the Football League for Wigan Borough.

== Senior career ==
Born in Ashton-under-Lyne, Lancashire, Woodworth started his career with Burnley but was unable to break into the senior team at the First Division club. In the summer of 1921, Woodward transferred to Wigan Borough in the newly formed Third Division North. He made his professional debut in the 2–1 win over Nelson at Seedhill on 27 August 1921 and went on to make a further two league appearances for Wigan Borough during the 1921–22 campaign. His final league match for the club came on 8 October in the 4–2 victory against Walsall at Springfield Park. Although Woodward was not selected for another competitive game, he remained with Wigan until the end of the season and featured in several Lancashire Senior Cup ties as the team progressed to the Second Round before being eliminated by Stockport County.

== Career statistics ==
Appearances and goals by club, season and competition
Club	Season	League			FA Cup		Other		Total	
Club	Season	Division	Apps	Goals	Apps	Goals	Apps	Goals	Apps	Goals
Burnley	1920–21	First Division	0	0	0	0	0	0	0	0
Wigan Borough	1921–22	Third Division North	3	0	0	0	3	0	6	0
Total			3	0	0	0	3	0	6	0

== See also ==
- List of Wigan Borough F.C. players

== Sources ==
- Joyce, Michael (2004). Football League Players' Records 1888–1939. Nottingham: SoccerData. p. 287. ISBN 1-899468-67-6.
- "Woodward, F (Fred)", English National Football Archive
