= Richard Woodward (organist) =

Irish composer

- Born: 1743
- Died: 22 November, 1777 (aged 33–34)
- Occupation: Composer
- Instrument: Organ

Richard Woodward the younger (c.1743/44 – 22 November 1777) was an Irish composer and organist, probably of English birth.

== Biography ==
Woodward was probably born in Salisbury and became a choirboy of Christ Church Cathedral, Dublin, in 1751, following the appointment of his father (of the same name) from Salisbury to the Dublin cathedral choir as a lay vicar choral. In 1764 Woodward was awarded a gold medal by the Hibernian Catch Club (which has been referred to as the oldest surviving musical society in Europe) for his canon Let the Words of My Mouth, which is inscribed on his memorial at Christ Church Cathedral. In 1771, Trinity College conferred upon him the degree of MusD. He had several students, including British composer Harriet Wainwright.

At the age of 22, in 1765, Woodward was appointed organist at Christ Church Cathedral as successor to George Walsh and choral vicar at St Patrick's Cathedral. His memorial records that he was "Preceptor to the Children of the two Choirs, Dublin." He died in Dublin aged 33.

== Music ==
Woodward was a composer of Anglican church music. His folio of glees and anthems formed the first collection of cathedral music published by an Irish composer. Woodward's compositions include Anglican chants, a service in B flat and seven anthems. Numerous works are contained in a folio of cathedral music, Opus 3, dedicated to Archbishop Smyth, which was printed by Peter Welcker of London in 1771. "Although Woodward's output is modest, it establishes him as one of the foremost Irish cathedral composers of the eighteenth century."
