= Sara G. Stanley =

African-American abolitionist and teacher

Sara Griffith Stanley Woodward (1837 – 1918) was an African American abolitionist, missionary teacher, and published author. Sara, sometimes listed as "Sarah", came from a biracial family, of which both black and white sides owned slaves. Despite this fact, she spent most of her working life promoting freedom and civil rights for African Americans. Her family's affluence enabled her to obtain a diploma in "Ladies Courses" from Oberlin College, the first college in the United States to admit African Americans beginning in 1835. She wrote and published several abolitionist works in journal magazines, but her most famous writing was an address on behalf of the Delaware Ladies' Antislavery Society given at the State Convention of Colored Men during the 1856 election year. After the American Civil War, she spent several years working as a teacher for the American Missionary Association, working in the North and in the South educating African American children.

== Early life and education ==
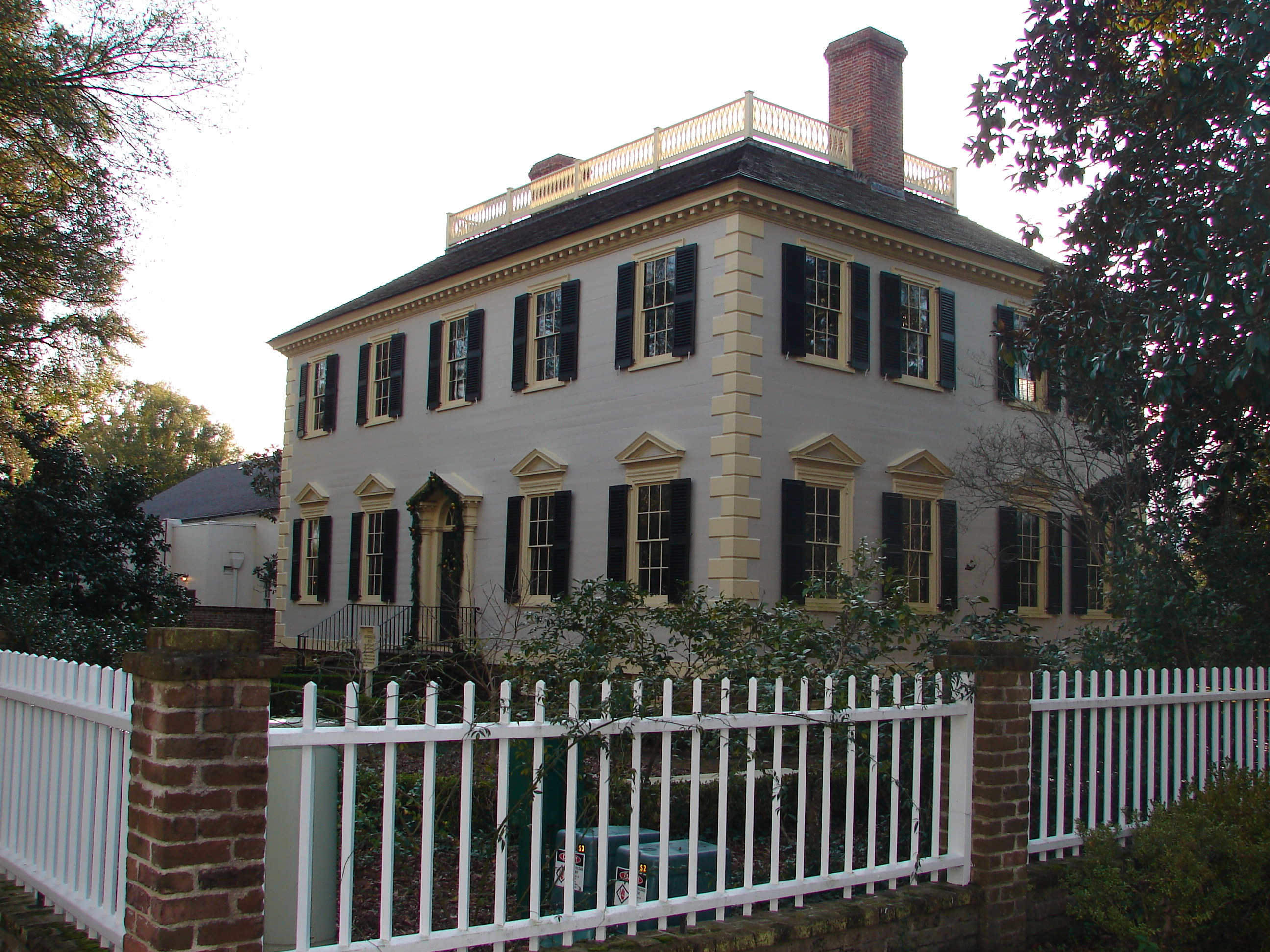
The house of John Wright Stanly. The Stanly family, both black and white, were founders of New Bern, N.C.

Stanley was born in 1837 to a family of free blacks in New Bern, N.C. She was one of six children born to Frances "Fannie" Griffith and John Stewart (Note: Stanley's father's middle name is often misspelled as "Stuart". He was named after John Carruther's former mistress Lydia Carruthers Stewart.) Stanley. Her father, who added the "e" back to his last name, was the son of former slave and wealthy plantation owner John Carruthers Stanly and the grandson of white trader and privateer John Wright Stanly, who had originally dropped the "e" in his family name. Coming from a respected and well-known family allowed the Stanleys to open a school for black children in New Bern. When he wasn't helping his father with his businesses and plantation, John and his wife Fannie were teachers at their school, thus allowing Sara to lead an academic centered life from a young age.

As a child, Stanley attended the First Presbyterian Church and sat in one of the back two pews that were purchased by her grandfather John Carruthers Stanly. In New Bern, it was not uncommon to see black and whites worshiping together, because during this time in North Carolina it was illegal for blacks to have their own churches.

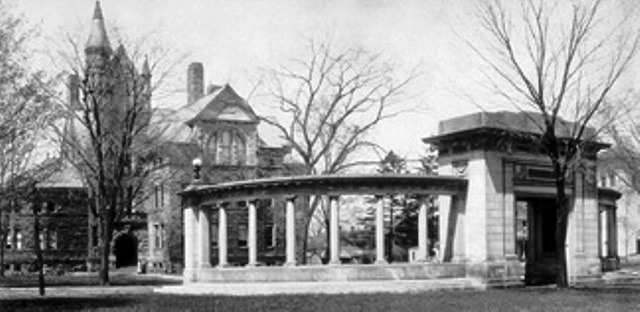
Oberlin College, circa 1909.

At age sixteen, Stanley was sent by her mother to attend Oberlin College in Oberlin, Ohio. She studied "Ladies Courses" for three years and earned a diploma that qualified her to teach. Oberlin provided a rare opportunity during the Antebellum period for Stanley to receive an interracial education, thus allowing her to develop her educational activism.

The slave uprising in South Carolina blamed on Denmark Vesey in 1822 resulted in increased legal restrictions on free black people in North Carolina. The heightened racial tensions resulting from resentment toward free blacks and the increased restrictions led Stanley's father and others to close schools for children of color. Afterwards, he moved his family to Delaware, Ohio, in the mid-1850s. Finishing her studies at Oberlin, Stanley moved with her parents to Cleveland, Ohio, where Fannie and John Stanley opened another school for black children. Stanley continued to teach for them until moving to teach in the public schools.

== Abolition work ==
By the age of 18, like many of the educated free black women of her time, Stanley was an active abolitionist. She had grown up around enslaved people on her family's plantation and had family members who were enslaved. An outspoken leader, she earned a position as a representative in the Delaware Ladies Anti-slavery Society. On their behalf, she wrote an impassioned speech to be read at the State Convention of Colored Men. The male-only crowd gathered to hear forty delegates who were rallying for the cause of black suffrage on January 16–18, 1856. Since women were not allowed inside, her petition was read aloud by delegate William Harris. It was titled: "To the Convention of Disenfranchised Citizens of Ohio". In the petition, Stanley appeals to the men's Christian faith in support of abolition, declaring that: "as Christian wives, mothers, and daughters... we pledge ourselves to exert our influence unceasingly in the cause of Liberty and Humanity."

There is some confusion regarding Stanley's authorship of this petition, as it is attributed to a "Sara G. Staley," not "Stanley." However, Ellen NicKenzie Lawson argued in her book that "the petition has all the earmarks of Stanley's literary style, so it seems likely the typesetter misprinted her last name leaving out the "n". Among Stanley's other works were articles for the Weekly Afro-American and American Missionary and an essay in 1862 on the "Brotherhood of Man". Later that year, she was recognized as an honorary members of the National Young Black Men's Literary Association.

In 1867, Stanley wrote a short article in the American Missionary about an interview she conducted with an elderly woman from Mississippi who recalled her life as a slave. Horrified by the interview, Sara wrote: "Surely many a lessen of patient endurance in the difficulties which beset our work, may we learn from these lowly ones. Pray for me, dear friends. I would be steadfast, immovable, always abounding in the work of the Lord, but am often weary in flesh and spirit, and cannot always realize the comforting assurance..."

== Educator of freed people ==
In March 1864, during the American Civil War, Stanley joined the Protestant American Missionary Association as a teacher for black children in the South. The purpose of the integrated organization was the "abolition of slavery, education of African Americans, promotion of racial equality, and spreading Christian values". By May, Stanley was sent to Norfolk, Virginia for her first teaching assignment at the Bute Street School, where she taught African American students who had been recently emancipated from slavery.

The war caused several problems for the school due to the constant military presence, the comings and goings of missionary staff unable to deal with the difficulties of the school's conditions, and serious bouts of sickness that would spread throughout the mission.

The close living and working conditions also caused serious rifts between the staff of black and white teachers. In one incident, Stanley, along with another black teacher, Edmonia Highgate, wrote a letter to the superintendent of the Norfolk America Missionary Association of Schools in which they criticized the behavior of William Croan, one of their superintendent professors. They claimed he was displaying a "prejudiced attitude towards the Blacks he was instructing".

Another conflict occurred involving Stanley and white teacher, Mrs. Gleason, who expressed her displeasure with working alongside African American staff. Gleason wrote letters to the AMA asking that all African American teachers be removed from the mission house. Stanley was particularly offended. Because she was light-skinned and blue eyes, she often passed as white. Before Gleason's declaration, Stanley had not drawn attention to her presence and was therefore offended by Gleason's comments. In a letter to George Whipple, the Corresponding Secretary of the AMA, Stanley wrote of the discrimination: "these exhibitions of prejudice on the part of the Missionary teachers supposed to be in the work because the love of Christ constrained them is to me very sad to contemplate" and "Oh the profound wisdom of this prejudice against color! When one half shade difference is to determine whether an individual is to be respected or despised".

Her troubles compounded as the combination of her outspokenness and light-skin got her labelled as "haughty", not only with the white staff but at least one other black teacher as well. Miss Gleason partnered with Clara Duncan, a black teacher and Oberon graduate, and together they accused Stanley of having an affair with another AMA teacher, Samuel Walker, who was white and married. Walker resigned his post over the scandal.

Although Stanley was allowed to stay with the AMA after the incident, two months later, she was sent to work St. Louis, Missouri, where her next school was a "small, windowless room in a church basement". The school was run and paid for by the local Colored Board of Education. There was very little money and supplies, but Stanley was impressed by her interactions with the students. She wrote in her report to the AMA "the preponderance of the mulattoes over the blacks immediately arrests the attention of the spectator... The Caucasian element is largely ascendant, many of the children have blond and red hair and the peculiarly white transparent complexion which is their usual accompaniment. A woeful commentary on the hideous iniquity of Slavery."

In the two months she was assigned to the school, Stanley expanded the program by using her own money to buy supplies, and started a successful Sunday school. During her time there, the AMA was slow to send her salary and travel money, but Stanley refused to accept tuition from indigent students. The same year the Civil War was over, "the school board changed in the fall of 1865 from an all-black to all-white board". The new white school board members wanted to replace the colored staff with white teachers. They forced Stanley to be reassigned, and she left in debt.

Stanley's next assignment was in Louisville, Kentucky, where, she taught in the basement of the Centre Street Colored Methodist Church run by the Colored Board of Education. Despite the harsh conditions of the basement, she helped grow attendance, and by May 1866 she was made principal. When the federal Freedman's Bureau took over under the new public school system, Stanley again found herself without a school.

By 1868, Stanley moved to Mobile, Alabama, again working as a teacher for the AMA. Stanley remained with the AMA until she left Mobile, Alabama in 1870.

== Family life ==
While on assignment for AMA in Alabama, 1868, Stanley met Charles A. Woodward, a white man who had served in the Union army during the Civil War. Charles, a trained mason, worked as a cashier at the Freedmen's Bank after the war. He was four years younger than Stanley. Despite the fact that she was so fair and both of them had blue eyes, he was still white and she was acknowledged to be a proud black woman. There is historical disagreement over whether or not the AMA supported Stanley's engagement to Woodward, but what is clear is the AMA feared retaliation from the local Ku Klux Klan. To complicate the event, the Association had just purchased a new building to expand the school. Local whites were already critical over the expansion of colored education and were further agitated over the rumors of the possibility of the Woodwards marrying in the new Mission House. The situation resolved itself when the wedding "quietly" took place at a friend's house.

Despite the initial notoriety of their marriage, the Woodwards spent several more years working and living in Mobile. Sara continued to teach with the AMA, moving to their training center at the Emerson Institute. She also worked part time with her husband at the Freedman's Bank as a cashier.

At some point before leaving Mobile, Sara gave birth to a baby girl. For an unknown reason, the baby died at six months old.

In 1874, Charles, who was the head cashier at the Freedman's Bank, was accused of embezzlement. Following a brief trial, he was found not guilty. Soon afterwards, the Woodwards moved to New Jersey, where according to several census records, they both listed themselves at "white". Charles died in 1885.

== Late life and death ==
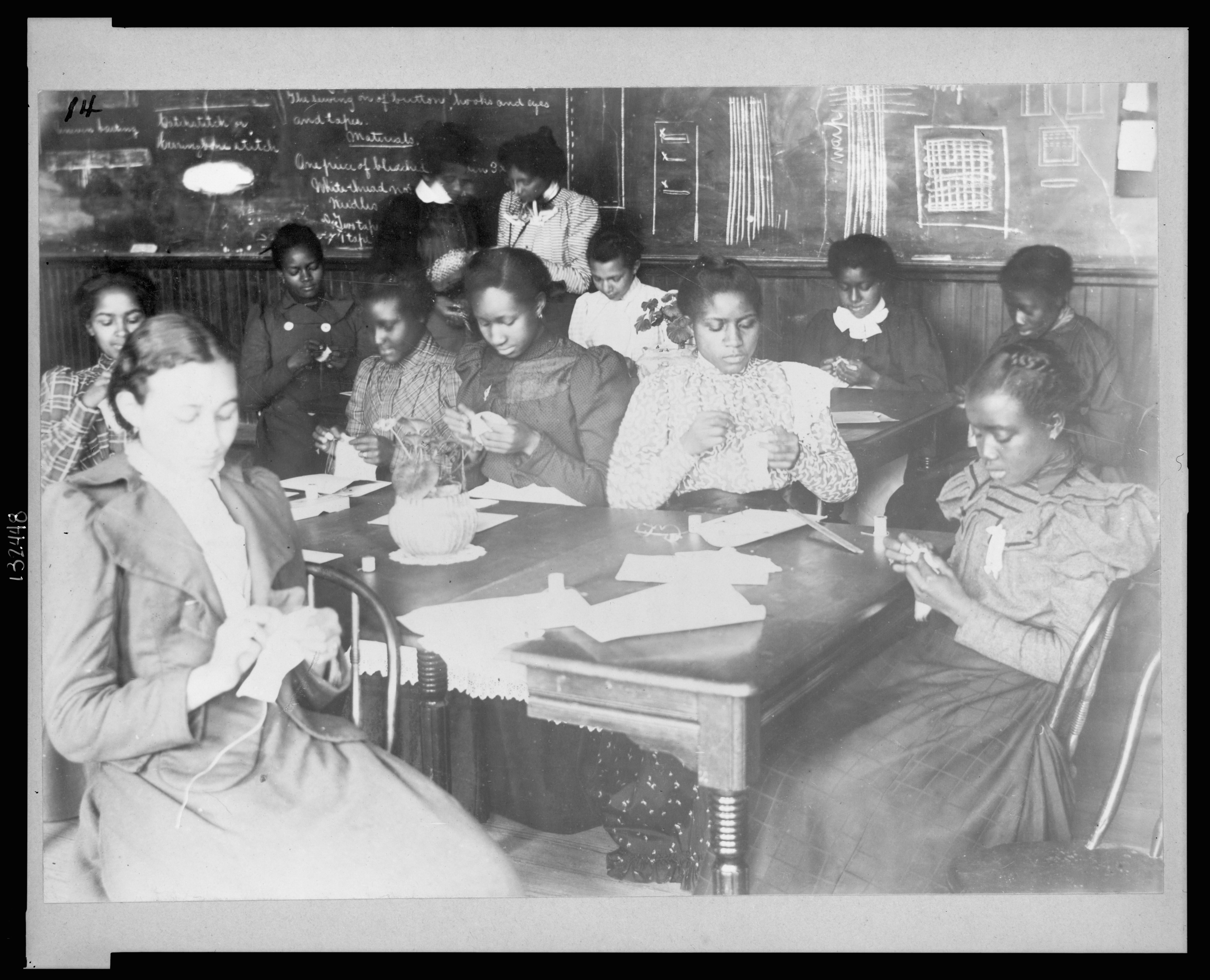
Sewing class at The Haines Normal and Industrial Institute, Augusta, GA, circa 1900.

After her husband's death, Stanley moved to Philadelphia, where she continued to receive her husband's military pension of $8 a month and worked as an engraver to supplement her income.

In 1894, Stanley briefly taught with notable abolitionist and educator Lucy Craft Laney at a small school for black women in Augusta, Georgia. At the time, the school was called "The Haines Normal and Industrial Institute", but in 1949 it was renamed "The Lucy Craft Laney Comprehensive High School".

Little is known about her later life, but according to the 1910 Census, Sara was again living in Cumberland County in New Jersey. It lists that she had 3 children, but 0 living. Sara Griffith Stanley Woodward died in 1918 at the age of 82. Her resting place is unknown.
