= Johnny Woodward =

English footballer and manager (1924–2002)

Personal information
- Full name: Horace John Woodward
- Date of birth: 16 January 1924
- Place of birth: Islington, England
- Date of death: 8 August 2002 (aged 78)
- Place of death: Cricklewood, England
- Position: Central defender

Senior career*
Years	Team	Apps	(Gls)
1939–1949	Tottenham Hotspur	63	(1)
1949–1951	Queens Park Rangers	57	(0)
1951	Tonbridge	?	(?)
	Snowdown Colliery Welfare	?	(?)
1953	Walsall	5	(0)
	Stourbridge	?	(?)
	Horsham	?	(?)

Managerial career
- Horsham
- ?–1971: Willesden & Kingsbury
- * Club domestic league appearances and goals

Horace John Woodward (16 January 1924 – 8 August 2002) was an English professional footballer who played for Tottenham Hotspur, Queens Park Rangers, Tonbridge, Snowdown Colliery Welfare, Walsall, Stourbridge and Horsham.

== Playing career ==
Woodward signed as an amateur for Tottenham Hotspur in 1939. In 1941, he made his senior debut in the London Wartime League. During World War II he served as a gunner in the Merchant Navy. On his return from duty Spurs offered him a professional contract in May 1946. The central defender made his Football League debut against Newport County in September 1946 when he replaced the injured Bill Nicholson – Woodward remains the only Lilywhite to make his League debut at Somerton Park. Woodward played a total of 67 matches in all competitions and scored one goal for the Lilies between 1946 and 1949. Queens Park Rangers paid £10,500 for his services in 1949. He went on to feature in a further 57 fixtures. After leaving Loftus Road he joined Tonbridge in 1951 and went on to have brief spells at Snowdown Colliery Welfare, Stourbridge and Walsall where he participated in five matches in 1953.

== Management career ==
Woodward became player/manager at Horsham before taking charge at Willesden & Kingsbury a post he held to 1971. He later went on to occasionally manager the Maccabi club of London. John also managed Barnet reserves when Barry Fry managed the Barnet first team in the late 1970's

== Post–football career ==
He continued to play football throughout the 1960s and regularly turned out for the Ex–Spurs XI while employed by Schweppes and then the British Oxygen Company. Woodward retired in 1988 before settling in Willesden. After a long illness, he died in a Cricklewood nursing home on 8 August 2002.
