= Thomas Bullene Woodward =

Thomas Bullene Woodward is an Episcopal priest and clown.

Having graduated from Harvard University and the General Theological Seminary, he has served as a chaplain at universities including the University of Kansas, the University of Rochester and the University of Wisconsin–Madison.

== Early life ==
Woodward grew up in Topeka, Kansas, the son of Brinton Webb Woodward and his wife. His brother Brinton W. Woodward, Jr. was a student at the General Theological Seminary, and became an ordained priest in the 1960s.

Woodward studied at Phillips Academy in Andover and graduated cum laude from Harvard University in 1960. He later received a theological degree from the General Theological Seminary, also studying at the Bossey Ecumenical Institute, the Esalen Institute and the Rochester Institute of Technology.

== Career ==
In June 1963, Woodward began serving as chaplain for the American Episcopal Church at the University of Kansas (KU). He was ordained by Kansas bishop Edward Clark Turner in December of that year. On March 8, 1965, Woodward took part in a civil rights protest at the offices of KU chancellor William Clarke Wescoe. The protest had been organised by members of the University of Kansas Civil Rights Council in opposition to alleged racial discrimination by landlords, fraternities and sororities. Woodward was one of 110 people arrested for attending the first day's demonstration, and the unrest ended two days later when Wescoe agreed to negotiate with the students' demands.

Woodward later began serving as rector of Christ Episcopal Church in Warrensburg, Missouri, and Episcopal chaplain of Central Missouri State College in the same city. He also served as chairman of the Warrensburg Planned Parenthood Association. In September 1971, he succeeded Hays Hamilton Rockwell to become the Protestant chaplain at the University of Rochester and began serving on the Genesee Ecumenical Ministry's Board for Campus Ministry. While there, Woodward began to incorporate aspects of clowning into his ministry as a response to the "very serious place" around him, giving his clown persona the name "Punambulo". He also developed a small street circus called Uncle Billy's Pocket Circus, which he performed in college campuses and street fairs.

Woodward's work in Rochester extended beyond the university walls, serving on the Steering Committee of the Rochester Diocese and teaching chess in various New York jails. He was arrested in Rochester during May 1972 after taking part in a demonstration against intensified U.S. bombing on North Vietnamese harbors. The charges were dropped in September of that year, alongside those of seven other people.

In November 1974, Woodward began serving as the Episcopal chaplain for the University of North Carolina at Chapel Hill. In 1977, he left Chapel Hill to become the Episcopal chaplain at the University of Wisconsin–Madison, being based out of St. Francis House in Madison. In 1978, he joined a coalition of religious groups, community groups and gay rights organizations in supporting a Madison ordinance which protected gay people from discrimination.

In May 1983, St. Francis House announced its opposition to United States policy on Guatemalan and Salvadoran refugees, declaring itself Madison's first sanctuary church for people seeking to flee those countries. On the topic, Woodward and church warden Margaret Scholtes wrote that "our faith calls us to provide sanctuary to those who we believe are fleeing from torture and persecution", arguing that refugees who were returned to their countries of origin were often executed. In September 1985, Woodward was elected to the Wisconsin Investment Board by members of the Wisconsin Senate.

In 1988, he began serving as rector of St. Paul's Episcopal Church in Salinas, California.

=== Writing career ===
In 1973, he published the book To Celebrate on the topic of Christian education. In 1975, he published the book Turning Things Upside Down: A Theological Workbook.

== Personal life ==
On June 12, 1963, Woodward was married in the Chapel of the Good Shepherd at the General Theological Seminary. His bride was Judith Averill Rose, the daughter of Lawrence Rose, the seminary's dean. By February 1975, the couple had three children.

== Publications ==
=== Books ===
- To Celebrate. Seabury Press. 1973.
- Turning Things Upside Down: A Theological Workbook. Seabury Press. 1975.
