= Rob Woodward (baseball) =

American baseball player (born 1962)

- Pitcher
- Born: September 28, 1962 (age 62); Hanover, New Hampshire, U.S.
- Batted: Right Threw: Right

MLB debut
- September 5, 1985, for the Boston Red Sox

Last MLB appearance
- September 26, 1988, for the Boston Red Sox

MLB statistics
- Win–loss record: 4–4
- Earned run average: 5.04
- Strikeouts: 45
- Stats at Baseball Reference

Teams
- Boston Red Sox (1985–1988)

Robert John Woodward (born September 28, 1962) is an American former professional baseball pitcher, who played in Major League Baseball (MLB) in parts of the 1985 through 1988 seasons, for the Boston Red Sox. Listed at 6' 3", 185 lb., he batted and threw right-handed.

Woodward spent his 11 years career in the Red Sox (1981–89) and Orioles (1990–91) systems. In his major league career, he posted a 4-4 record with a 5.04 ERA in 24 appearances, including 14 starts, giving up 68 runs (eight unearned) on 118 hits and 36 walks while striking out 45 in 100 innings pitched.

Woodward is also famous for his heated argument with Dave Winfield in 1985 after Winfield accidentally let go of his bat twice in a game and almost hit Woodward both times.

At four different minor league levels, Woodward went 81-79 with a 3.94 ERA in 345 appearances. While playing for the 1986 Pawtucket Red Sox, he pitched 21 2/3 consecutive scoreless innings, setting a club record that still stands today. During the 2008 season, Devern Hansack ran a string of consecutive scoreless innings to 25 for the second longest streak in the club history.
