= Stanley Woodward (editor) =

American newspaper editor and sportswriter (1895–1965)

- Born: June 5, 1895; Worcester, Massachusetts, U.S.
- Died: November 29, 1965 (aged 70); White Plains, New York, U.S.
- Education: Amherst College
- Occupations: Editor and sportswriter
- Employer(s): Boston Herald; New York Herald Tribune; The Star-Ledger
- Partner: Esther Rice
- Children: Two daughters
- Awards: National Sportscasters and Sportswriters Hall of Fame

Rufus Stanley Woodward (June 5, 1895 – November 29, 1965) was an American newspaper editor and sportswriter. He worked for the New York Herald Tribune from 1930 to 1948 and from 1959 to 1962. Woodward is a member of the National Sportscasters and Sportswriters Hall of Fame. His October 14, 1933, column on college football is the first known public instance in which the phrase "ivy" was used in reference to what subsequently became known as the Ivy League colleges.

Woodward began his career as a news reporter and eventually became the sports editor for the Boston Herald. In 1930, he joined the Herald Tribune as a writer, and he gained a promotion to editor of the sports section in 1938. Except for a period during World War II in which he was a correspondent, Woodward remained in that role until being fired in 1948. After editing and writing for various publications, he returned to the Herald Tribune in 1959 and retired as sports editor emeritus.

== Early life and career ==
Born in Worcester, Massachusetts, the son of Rufus and Stella Woodward, Stanley Woodward attended Amherst College and played tackle for the school's football team. After his 1917 graduation he joined the United States Merchant Marine, serving during World War I. In 1919 or 1920 Woodward was hired by his hometown newspaper, the Worcester Gazette, his first job in the field of journalism. Originally employed as a news reporter, he later became the paper's city editor. Woodward left the Gazette in 1922 or 1923 for a job at the Boston Herald. After starting as a makeup man, he served various roles for the Herald, and in 1925 was named the paper's sports editor.

== Sportswriting career ==
Woodward remained with the Herald for the rest of the 1920s, but moved to the New York Herald Tribune in 1930. Through 1938, he was a sportswriter for the paper. His writing style was described by writer Ira Berkow as "earnest and sometimes plodding", though it did include the occasional witticism. For example, after an Army college football coach attributed his team's loss to its center's snapping technique Woodward joked it was "like blaming the Johnstown flood on a leaky toilet in Altoona."

Another of Woodward's lines related to a group of nine football-playing colleges in the eastern U.S., including Harvard, Princeton, and Yale. After rumors began that these schools would form their own athletic conference, Woodward wrote a column on October 14, 1933, about college football. There, he mentioned that "A proportion of our eastern ivy colleges are meeting little fellows another Saturday before plunging into the strife and the turmoil." Sportswriter Al Laney later wrote that Woodward's intention in using the "ivy" wording "was joyfully needling some of the group, especially Harvard, for their snootiness". The 1933 column is the first known public use of the phrase "ivy" in reference to what have since become recognized as the Ivy League colleges. Although Woodward was credited by some sources with pioneering the full term "Ivy League", that distinction goes to Associated Press editor Alan J. Gould, who first used the name two years later. Woodward himself began using the reference in his own writings after it gained popularity.

Eight of the nine universities mentioned in Woodward's 1933 column went on to form the Ivy League football conference, signing the "Ivy Group Agreement" for their programs in 1945, and expanding it to other sports nine years later. Only Army failed to join.

== First stint as sports editor of the Herald Tribune ==
Woodward was promoted to sports editor of the Herald Tribune upon the death of George Herbert Daley in 1938. He was described by author Richard Kluger as "the best sports editor in the Tribune's, or probably any paper's, history." A goal of Woodward was to make the Herald Tribune's sports section higher in quality than those in other newspapers. This placed his section in competition with The New York Times, whose sports section had twice as many writers. Woodward believed that the Herald Tribune should avoid competing with the Times on quantity. Jerry Izenberg quoted him as saying, "They've got a lot of people, so we can't outcrap 'em. But, we sure as hell can outwrite 'em." The desire of Woodward was to make the section he led more "interesting" than its local rivals. In one instance when a managing editor wanted to place a sports story on the front page of the Herald Tribune, Woodward was said to have asked, "Why bury a good story like that?"

As a matter of policy Woodward sought to hire writers he believed were on the same level as himself. He also preferred staffers who could handle deadlines over slower-writing, more scholarly scribes. Woodward did not require prospective hires to have sports knowledge, recommending they do general journalism work for multiple years before moving on to a more specific writing job. In choosing sports to cover, Woodward felt that baseball, boxing, football, and horse racing were the most significant. Basketball was among those sports he did not favor; he called it the "goonosphere".

Early in his tenure as the Herald Tribune's sports editor, Woodward continued to write in-season columns on college football. His knowledge of the sport earned him the nickname "The Coach" from other writers. Woodward served as the paper's sports editor through 1941, leaving to serve as a war correspondent before returning to his position in 1946. Among the military operations he covered during World War II were the invasion of Arnhem in the Netherlands by the 101st Airborne Division and the Battle of Iwo Jima in the Pacific Theatre.

=== Hiring of Red Smith and Jackie Robinson strike story ===
During the war years Woodward maintained involvement in the Herald Tribune's sports section. In 1943 and 1944 he directed his writers to prepare a series of articles on formerly famous sports figures who had dropped out of the public spotlight. The "Forgotten Men" articles included one on the boxer Sam Langford, whom Laney was told had died. Langford was instead found alive but living in poverty. The article received widespread attention and led to numerous donations from concerned readers. In addition, Woodward brought sportswriter Red Smith to the Herald Tribune in 1945. Though toiling as an unknown for The Philadelphia Record at the time, he had been sought by Woodward since the late 1930s. Hired as a feature writer, Smith eventually became a Pulitzer Prize-winning nationally syndicated columnist. In addition to Laney, who handled special assignments in addition to tennis and golf coverage, other writers working under Woodward during his tenure at the Herald Tribune included Jesse Abramson, who covered football and multiple other sports; and Joe H. Palmer, who reported on horse racing.

After Jackie Robinson broke the Major League Baseball color line in 1947, Woodward wrote a story in the May 9, 1947, edition of the Herald Tribune that unidentified St. Louis Cardinals players had been rallying support for a strike by National League teams, in which they would attempt to put pressure on Robinson by not playing against him. According to the column, National League president Ford C. Frick indicated that he would suspend all striking players, heading off the plot. Woodward quoted Frick as telling the players involved, "I do not care if half the league strikes. Those who do it will encounter quick retribution. And will be suspended and I don't care if it wrecks the National League for five years." The Cardinals players denied the report, which did not include a source; author Roger Kahn learned from Woodward that Frick was his source. Woodward wrote a follow-up story on May 10, contradicting his original claim that Frick had talked to Cardinals players. The initial story, however, was responsible for increasing the sports media's support for Robinson, and the Frick quote was repeated by writers in future years.

=== Firing ===
In 1948, Woodward received an order from management to fire two employees close to retirement age. In response, he jokingly sent a form with two names: Smith's and his own. Woodward's obituary in The New York Times cited this incident as an example of him having an independent mindset. Regarding his workplace relationships, Palmer said that Woodward was frequently "contemptuous of superiors," while showing kindness to lower-level employees. Later in 1948, Woodward was fired by the paper. According to Smith, Helen Rogers Reid ordered his firing because he refused to send a writer to a women's golf tournament.

== Later career ==
After leaving the Herald Tribune, Woodward successfully pitched the idea of a monthly sports magazine to Dell Publications, which he edited. The magazine was titled Sports Illustrated, and was not related to the modern-day publication. Sports Illustrated premiered in February 1949; it suffered from weak sales figures and folded after less than a year. Woodward remained active in various roles in the publishing field. On an annual basis, he edited a series of college football guides. In 1949, Woodward wrote Sports Page, a book that offered advice about running sports sections at newspapers. Sports Page became a key text in the field. The Daily Compass hired Woodward as a columnist in 1949; he stayed at that position into 1950, before leaving to become the editor of the sports section at The Miami News. He held that role for five years, then from 1955 to 1958 wrote for the Advance Publications chain of newspapers. For one of that company's publications, The Star-Ledger, he became editor of the sports section, and in early 1959 he was promoted to the title of executive sports editor for Advance Publications.

On February 5, 1959, the Herald Tribune announced that Woodward would return to his former job as that newspaper's sports editor. Woodward was later asked for his thoughts about the Herald Tribune management figures who had previously fired him, and he gave the four-word answer, "Time wounds all heels." His initial column during his second stint at the Herald Tribune started, "As I was saying when I was so rudely interrupted 11 years ago. ..." Woodward considered the sports department to be "in frightful shape" at the time he came back, but he quickly moved to replace members of the Herald Tribune's staff, with some hires from the Star-Ledger. Book critic Jonathan Yardley wrote that Woodward was responsible for "an instant rebirth" of the section. Woodward worked at the Herald Tribune until 1962, when he retired from the sports editor position. He retained the title of sports editor emeritus after his retirement, and sometimes contributed columns. In addition, he was a sports commentator for a Connecticut radio station, and in 1964 wrote the book Paper Tiger, a career retrospective.

Woodward died in White Plains Hospital on November 29, 1965. Before his death, he had completed the book Sports Writer, but had not copy-edited it. After receiving editing from the son of writer Frank Graham, it was posthumously released. In 1974, Woodward became a member of the National Sportscasters and Sportswriters Hall of Fame.

== Personal life ==
Early in his time working in New York City, Woodward resided in Port Washington and took up yachting as a hobby. He eventually moved to Princeton, New Jersey, where he purchased a farm. Woodward's other hobbies included violin-playing and ornithology.

In 1932, Woodward and Esther Rice were married. The couple had two children, both daughters, and six grandchildren. They remained married at the time of Woodward's death in 1965, when they resided in Brookfield, Connecticut.

== Bibliography ==
- Berkow, Ira (1986). Red: A Biography of Red Smith. Times Books. ISBN 978-0-8129-1203-6.
- Bernstein, Mark F. (2001). Football: The Ivy League Origins of an American Obsession. University of Pennsylvania Press. ISBN 978-0-8122-3627-9.
- Holtzman, Jerome (2015). Jerome Holtzman on Baseball: A History of Baseball Scribes. Sports Publishing LLC. ISBN 978-1-58261-976-7.
- MacCambridge, Michael (1997). The Franchise: A History of Sports Illustrated Magazine. Hyperion. ISBN 978-0-7868-6216-0.
- Ziegler, John H. (1995). Porter, David L. (ed.). Biographical Dictionary of American Sports: 1992–1995 Supplement for Baseball, Football, Basketball and Other Sports. Greenwood Publishing Group. ISBN 978-0-313-28431-1.
