= Doug Woodward (sailor) =

Canadian sailor

Douglas Woodward
Personal information
- Nationality: Canadian
- Born: 14 March 1925
- Died: 16 May 1995 (aged 70) Pointe-Claire, Quebec, Canada

Sport
- Sport: Sailing

John Douglas "Doug" Woodward (14 March 1925 – 16 May 1995), also known as Douglas Woodward, was a Canadian sailor who competed in the 1952 Summer Olympics and in the 1964 Summer Olympics.

== See also ==
- John Douglas Woodward, the 19th-century artist
