= John Woodward (Scottish footballer) =

Scottish footballer

Personal information
- Full name: John Woodward
- Date of birth: 10 January 1949 (age 77)
- Place of birth: Glasgow, Scotland
- Height: 5 ft 10 in (1.78 m)
- Positions: Defender; midfielder

Senior career*
Years	Team	Apps	(Gls)
?–1966	Possilpark YMCA	?	(?)
1966–1971	Arsenal	3	(0)
1971–1977	York City	167	(6)

International career
1967	Scotland XI	3	(0)
- * Club domestic league appearances and goals

John Woodward (born 10 January 1949) is a Scottish former footballer.

== Career ==
Born in Glasgow, Scotland, Woodward started his career with Possilpark YMCA before joining Arsenal in January 1966.

Woodward made his Arsenal debut on Wednesday 5 October 1966 in a 3–1 defeat to West Ham United in the League Cup 3rd Round at Highbury.
