= Gilbert H. Woodward =

United States Army officer

Gilbert Hume Woodward
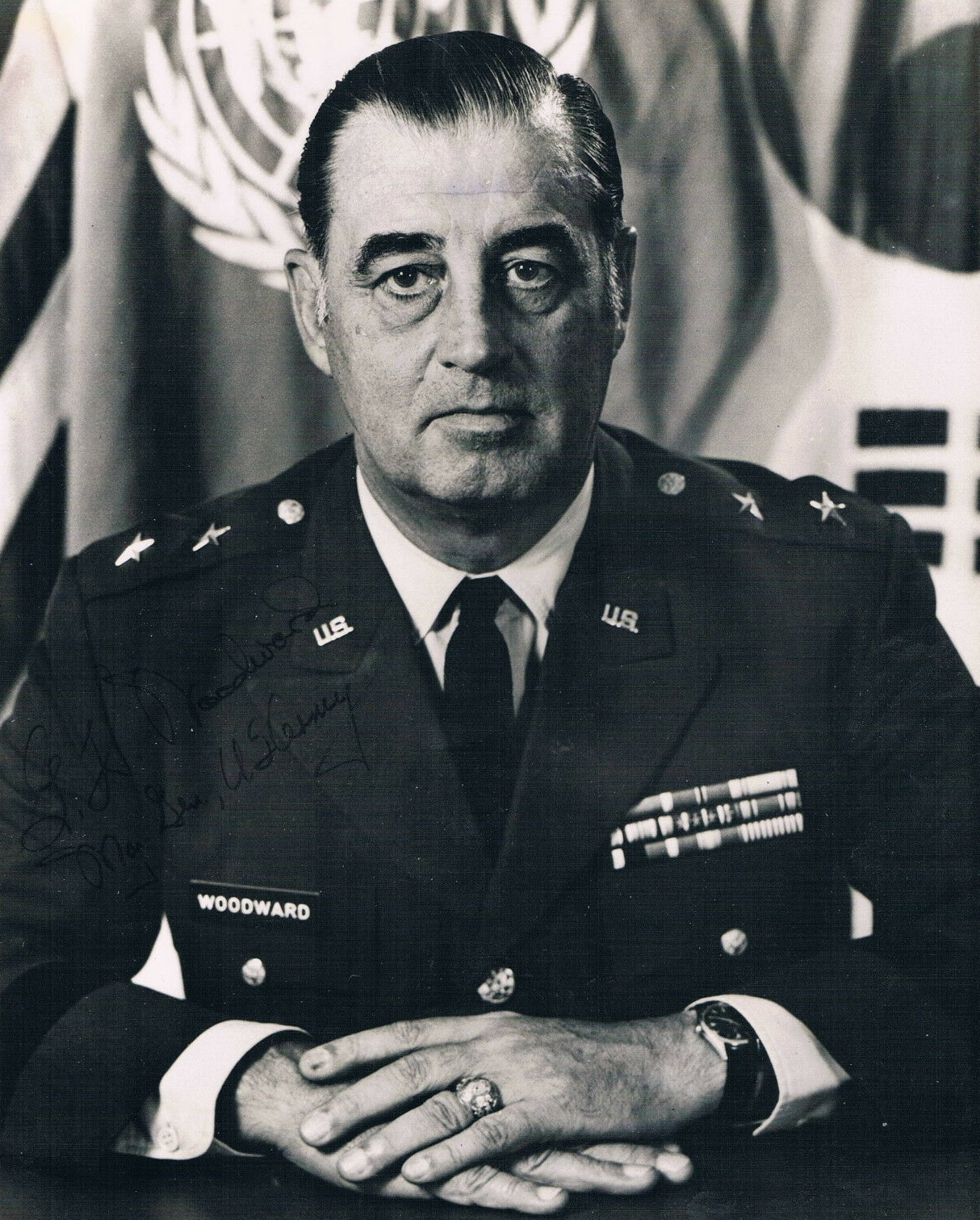
- Woodward as a major general commanding the 2nd Infantry Division, circa 1970
- Born: 8 June 1917; Suffolk, Virginia, U.S.
- Died: 17 October 1973 (aged 56); London, England
- Burial place: Cedar Hill Cemetery (Suffolk, Virginia)
- Military career
- Branch: United States Army
- Service years: 1940–1973
- Rank: Lieutenant General
- Nickname: Woodie
- Commands: 2nd Infantry Division
- Conflicts: World War II; Korean DMZ Conflict; Vietnam War
- Awards: Distinguished Service Medal (2); Legion of Merit (3); Bronze Star

Lieutenant General Gilbert Hume Woodward (8 June 1917 – 17 October 1973) was a United States Army officer who served in World War II, the Korean DMZ Conflict and the Vietnam War.

== Early life ==
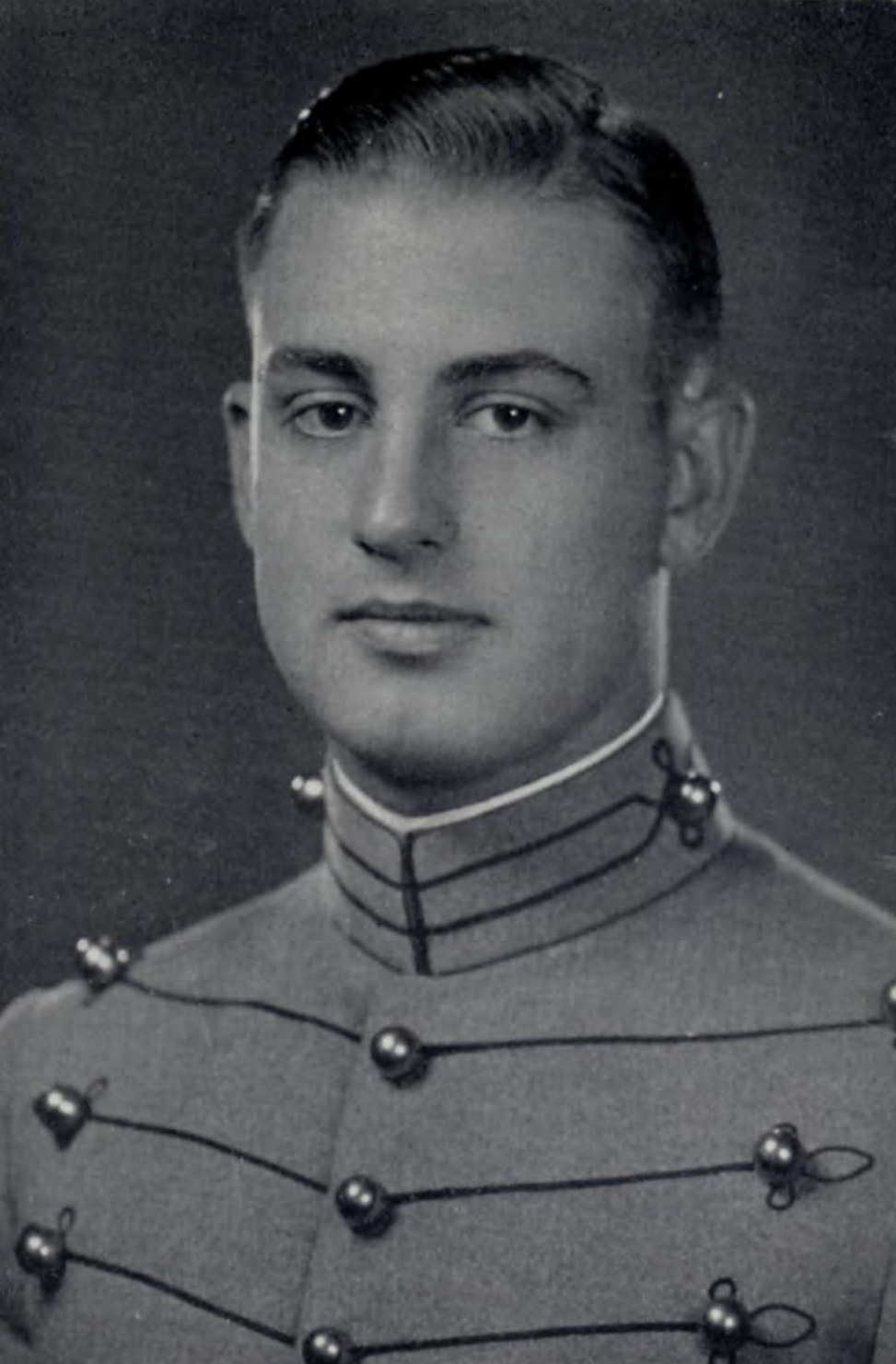
Woodward as a West Point cadet in 1940

Woodward was born in Suffolk, Virginia to Richard Lafayette Woodward Jr., a prominent local businessman who served as mayor of Suffolk from 1951 to 1955, and Gladys Alida (née Delves) Woodward. He attended Columbian Preparatory School, Washington, D.C.

== Military career ==
He graduated from the United States Military Academy in the class of 1940 as a Second lieutenant in the cavalry. He joined the 8th Cavalry Regiment at Fort Bliss and then in 1942 he became an assistant Operations officer in the 84th Infantry Division. He attended Command and General Staff College in 1943 and then returned to the 84th Infantry Division. In March 1944 he was appointed as commanding officer of special troops of the 94th Infantry Division. After the war he performed occupation duty in Czechoslovakia.

In 1947 he attended graduate school in political studies at the University of Virginia and then served as an instructor at West Point while completing graduate studies in public law and government at Columbia University. In 1950 he attended the United States Army Armor School and then commanded an armored infantry battalion of the 2nd Armored Division in West Germany from July 1951 to 1953. From 1953 to 1955 he was staff secretary to the commander of the Berlin Brigade. He then attended the Armed Forces Staff College.

He then served in various roles at The Pentagon and then attended National War College from 1958 to 1959 following which he was assigned to the plans division of Supreme Headquarters Allied Powers Europe. In 1962 he commanded Combat Command B, 3rd Armored Division in West Germany. He returned to the Pentagon in 1963 and was promoted to Brigadier General, he served in various roles before becoming Assistant Division Commander of the 2nd Armored Division in September 1966.

In April 1968 he was appointed as Senior Member, United Nations Command, Military Armistice Commission, Korea in South Korea. In this role he led the negotiations for the return of the crew of the USS Pueblo who had been captured by North Korea on 23 January 1968. Following an apology, a written admission by the U.S. that Pueblo had been spying, and an assurance that the U.S. would not spy in the future, the North Korean government decided to release the 82 remaining crew members, although the written apology was preceded by an oral statement by Woodward that it was done only to secure the release of the Pueblo crew. Woodward's statement was:

The position of the United States Government with regard to the Pueblo, as consistently expressed in the negotiations at Panmunjom and in public, has been that the ship was not engaged in illegal activity, that there is no convincing evidence that the ship at any time intruded into the territorial waters claimed by North Korea, and that we could not apologize for actions which we did not believe took place. The document which I am going to sign was prepared by the North Koreans and is at variance with the above position, but my signature will not and cannot alter the facts. I will sign the document to free the crew and only to free the crew.

He served at the Pentagon again from March 1969 until September 1970 when he took command of the 2nd Infantry Division in South Korea. He commanded the division until November 1971 when he returned to the Pentagon to serve as Deputy Director of the Joint Staff, Organization, Joint Chiefs of Staff.

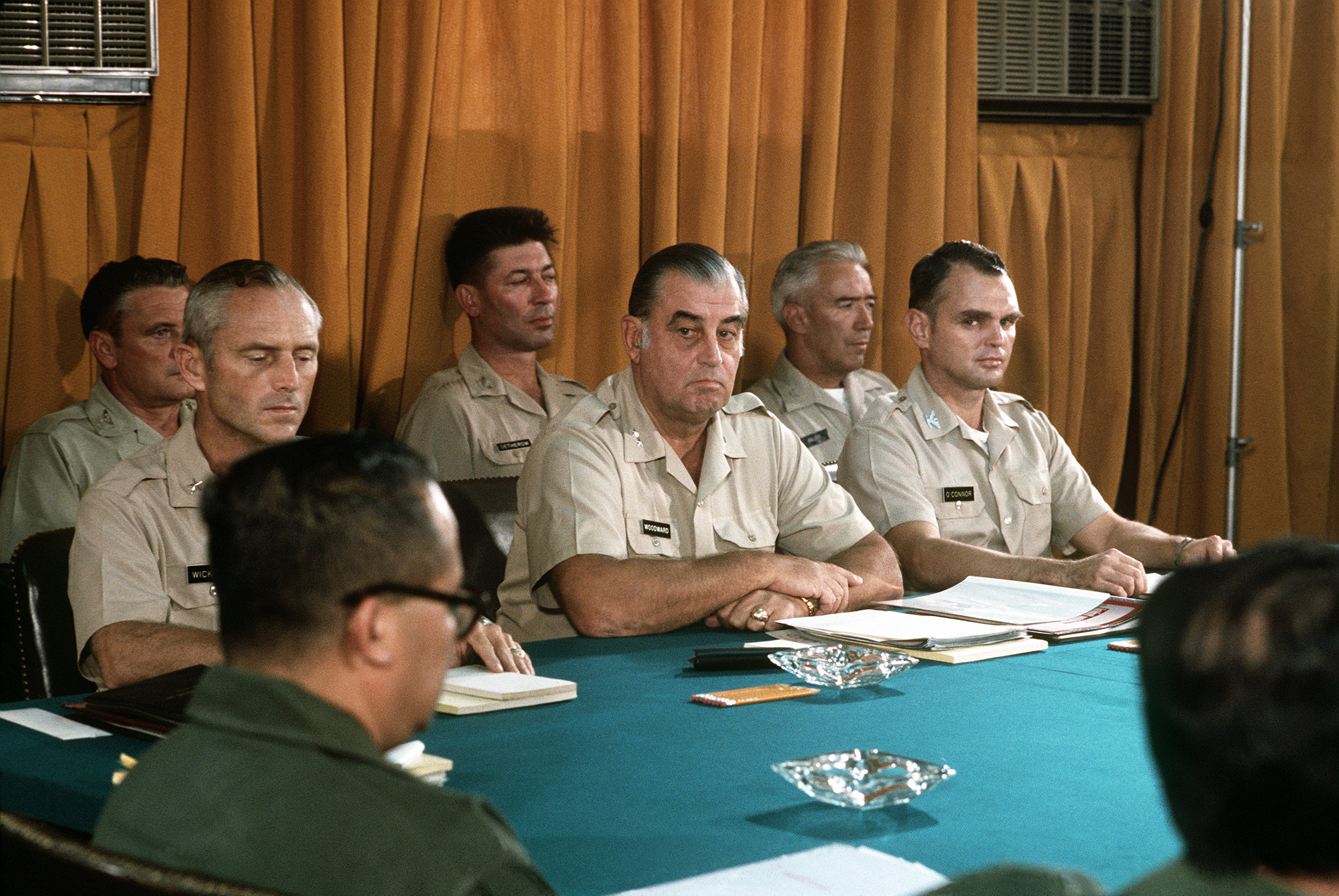
Woodward, center, leads the U.S. military delegates at the Four Party Joint Military Commission conference, 2 February 1973

In May 1972 he was assigned to South Vietnam where he served as Chief of Staff, Military Assistance Command Vietnam (MACV). In November 1972 the MACV commander General Frederick C. Weyand tasked Woodward with planning for the organization of the four-party commission that was to implement the ceasefire and supervise the exchange of prisoners and the U.S. troop withdrawal in accordance with the Paris Peace Accords which were nearing finalization. By early November, Woodward and his team had outlined how the Four-Party Joint Military Commission consisting of representatives from South Vietnam, the United States, North Vietnam and the Provisional Revolutionary Government of the Republic of South Vietnam (PRG) should be organized and the requirements for an effective ceasefire. In January 1973, Woodward travelled to Paris to participate in the last stages of the technical negotiations. The final ceasefire protocol closely followed the principles MACV had outlined. On 28 January 1973 Woodward was appointed as the United States representative to the Four-Party Joint Military Commission responsible for implementing the Paris Peace Accords. The Four-Party Joint Military Commission was disbanded on 29 March and replaced by the Two-Party Joint Military Commission consisting of representatives of South Vietnam and the PRG.

In June 1973 Woodward was appointed as Inspector General of the United States Army. On 17 October 1973 Woodward was flying from the Washington D.C. via London to West Germany on an inspection tour when he collapsed on the flight. The plane landed at Heathrow Airport and Woodward was taken to Ashford Hospital where he died.

He was buried at Cedar Hill Cemetery in Suffolk, Virginia.

== Decorations ==
His decorations included the Distinguished Service Medal (2), the Legion of Merit (3) and the Bronze Star.
