= Caroline Marshall Woodward =

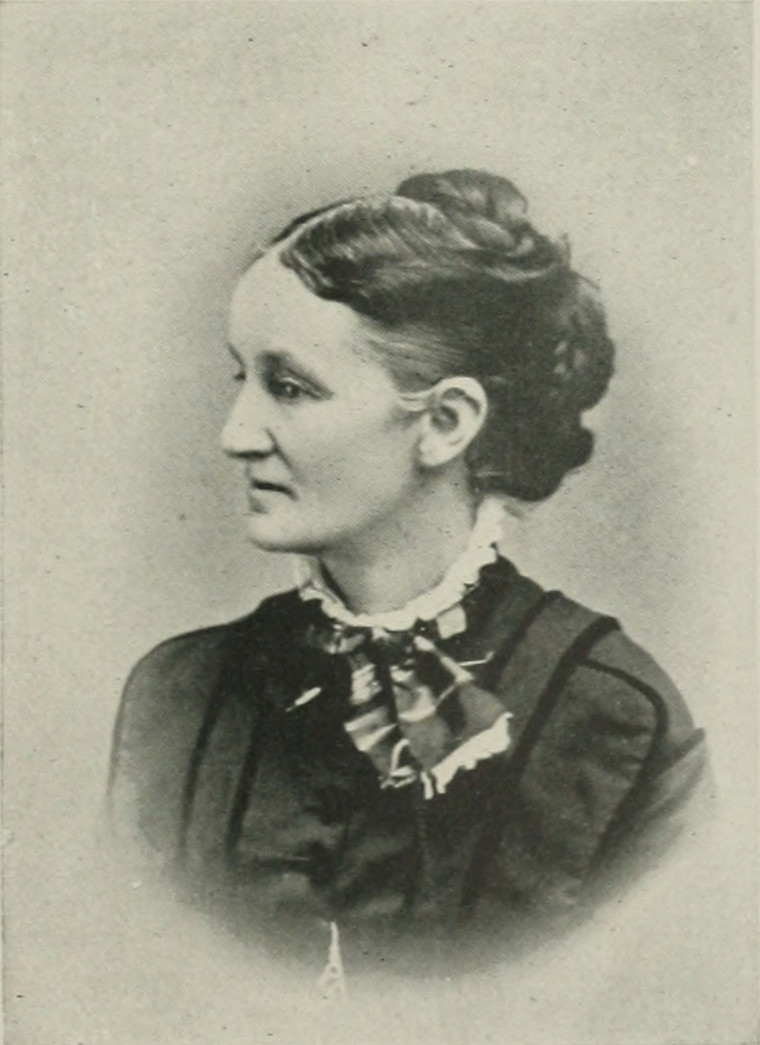
- Photo in A Woman of the Century
- Born: Caroline L. Marshall; October 12, 1828; Newmarket, New Hampshire, U.S.
- Died: November 28, 1890 (aged 62); Fort Wayne, Indiana, U.S.
- Occupation: author
- Spouse: William W. Woodward (m. 1848)
- Writing career
- Notable works: "The Old, Old Stairs"; "Dumb Voices"

Caroline Marshall Woodward (née, Marshall); known after marriage as Mrs. C. L. M. Woodward; and, Caroline C. Marshal Woodward; 1828–1890), was an American author and poet from New Hampshire. She gained recognition among nineteenth-century literary circles for her lyrical works, "The Old, Old Stairs" and "Dumb Voices". After her marriage, she lived successively in Ohio and Indiana, where she also studied languages and art while continuing to write for leading periodicals.

== Biography ==
Caroline L. Marshall was born in Newmarket, New Hampshire, October 12, 1828. Her father. Capt. John Marshall, was a native of Concord, Massachusetts. She had at least two siblings, brothers, John H. and Thomas R.

At the age of eight, Woodward started a diary, and was consistent in keeping it up, often writing in rhyme.

On December 25, 1848, she married William W. Woodward, in Concord, New Hampshire. In 1852, they moved to Wooster, Ohio. There they buried their son, aged four years. Their next move was to Fort Wayne, Indiana, where Mr. Woodward worked as a railroad contractor. With his brother, M. E. Woodward, and Charles Fletcher, they built a part of the Wabash Railroad. Mr. Woodward also superintended the construction of the Pittsburg Railroad.

In Fort Wayne, she began studying French and German. Later, she took lessons in oil painting, but believing that she was given improper instruction, she gave up her tuition and proceeded to learn art for herself. Woodward also kept up her writing, becoming a contributor to some of the leading magazines of the country. Her poems "The Old, Old Stairs" and "Dumb Voices" ranked her among the best writers of her day.

For the last 20 years of her life, Woodward resided at the "Wood Mansion" in Fort Wayne. She was sick for about two months before she died in Fort Wayne, on November 28, 1890, age 62, (Note: The Fort Wayne Sentinel (28 November 1890) reported Woodward as being age 65 at the time of her death.) of heart-failure, following an attack of influenza.
