= Thomas Woodward (theologian) =

Thomas Best Woodward (1814–1875), M.A. was an Anglican priest in Ireland during the 19th century.

Woodward was born in County Tipperary in 1814 and educated at Trinity College, Dublin. He was Protestant Chaplain in the County Gaol, Downpatrick; and, from 1856 until his death in 1875, the Dean of Down (a maritime county in Ulster Province, Ireland).

== Publications ==
- Treatise on the Nature of Man, Regarded as Triune; with an Outline of a Philosophy of Life, Thomas Best Woodward, Hodder & Stoughton, London, 1874, ASIN: B000JVKURS
- Works by William Archer Butler, M.A., Late Professor of Moral Philosophy of University of Dublin: I. Sermons Doctrinal and Practical, edited with a memoir of the Author's Life by the Very Rev. Thomas Woodward, M.A., Eighth Edition, William Archer Butler, Thomas Woodward, M.A., Macmillan & Co., London, 1869.
