= Richard B. Woodward =

American arts critic (1953–2023)

Richard B. Woodward (1953–2023) was an arts critic in New York from 1985. His contributions appeared in The New York Times The Wall Street Journal, The Atlantic, Bookforum, Film Comment, The American Scholar, The New Yorker, Vanity Fair, Interview, Vogue, and The New Criterion. Essays on art and photography by Woodward were included in over 20 monographs and museum catalogs.

Woodward suffered from idiopathic pulmonary fibrosis (IPF). He died in 2023.
