= Woodard =

Woodard (UK: /ˈwʊdɑːrd/ WUUD-ard, US: /ˈwʊdərd/ WUUD-ərd) is an English-language surname. People with this name include:

== Persons ==
- Alfre Woodard (born 1952), American actress
- Beulah Woodard (1895–1955), American sculptor
- Brandon Woodard (born 1990), American politician
- Charlayne Woodard (born 1953), American playwright and actress
- Charles F. Woodard (1848–1907), Justice of the Maine Supreme Judicial Court
- Colin Woodard (born 1968), American journalist and writer
- Cora Lily Woodard (1868–1952), American political hostess
- David Woodard (born 1964), American conductor and writer
- Dick Woodard (1926–2019), American football player
- Duane Woodard (born 1938), 34th Colorado Attorney General
- Dustin Woodard (born 1997), American football player
- Frederick Augustus Woodard (1854–1915), American politician
- George Woodard (born 1952), American actor and dairy farmer
- Horace Woodard (1904–1973), American cinematographer and producer
- Isaac Woodard (1919–1992), American World War II veteran and police brutality victim
- Jackson Woodard (born 2002), American football player
- John E. Woodard (1855–1928), American politician and lawyer from North Carolina
- Jonathan Woodard (born 1993), American football player
- Lee Woodard (1884–1947), son of Lyman E. Woodard, of the Lee Woodard Furniture Company
- Leslie Woodard (born 1964), American volleyball player
- Lyman E. Woodard (1834–1904), founder of the Lyman Woodard Company
- Lyman Woodard (1942–2009), American jazz organist
- Lynette Woodard (born 1959), American basketball player and coach
- Marc Woodard (born 1970), American football player
- Michael J. Woodard (born 1997), American singer and voice actor
- Mike Woodard (baseball) (born 1960), American baseball player
- Mike Woodard (politician) (born 1959), American politician
- Milt Woodard (1911–1996), American sportswriter and football executive
- Nathaniel Woodard (1811–1891), English Anglican priest and educator
- Pamela Woodard, American cardiovascular physician
- Ray Woodard (born 1961), American football player and coach
- Ray Woodard (soccer coach) (1936–2009), American soccer player and coach
- Ricci Woodard, American softball coach
- Robert Woodard (Royal Navy officer) (born 1939), English Rear-Admiral
- Robert Woodard (baseball) (born 1985), American baseball player and coach
- Robert Woodard II (born 1999), American basketball player
- Stacy Woodard (1902–1942), American producer and cinematographer
- Steve Woodard (born 1975), American baseball pitcher
- Wayne Francis Woodard (1914–1964), American artist and writer
- Willard Woodard (1824–1891), American politician, publisher, and parks advocate
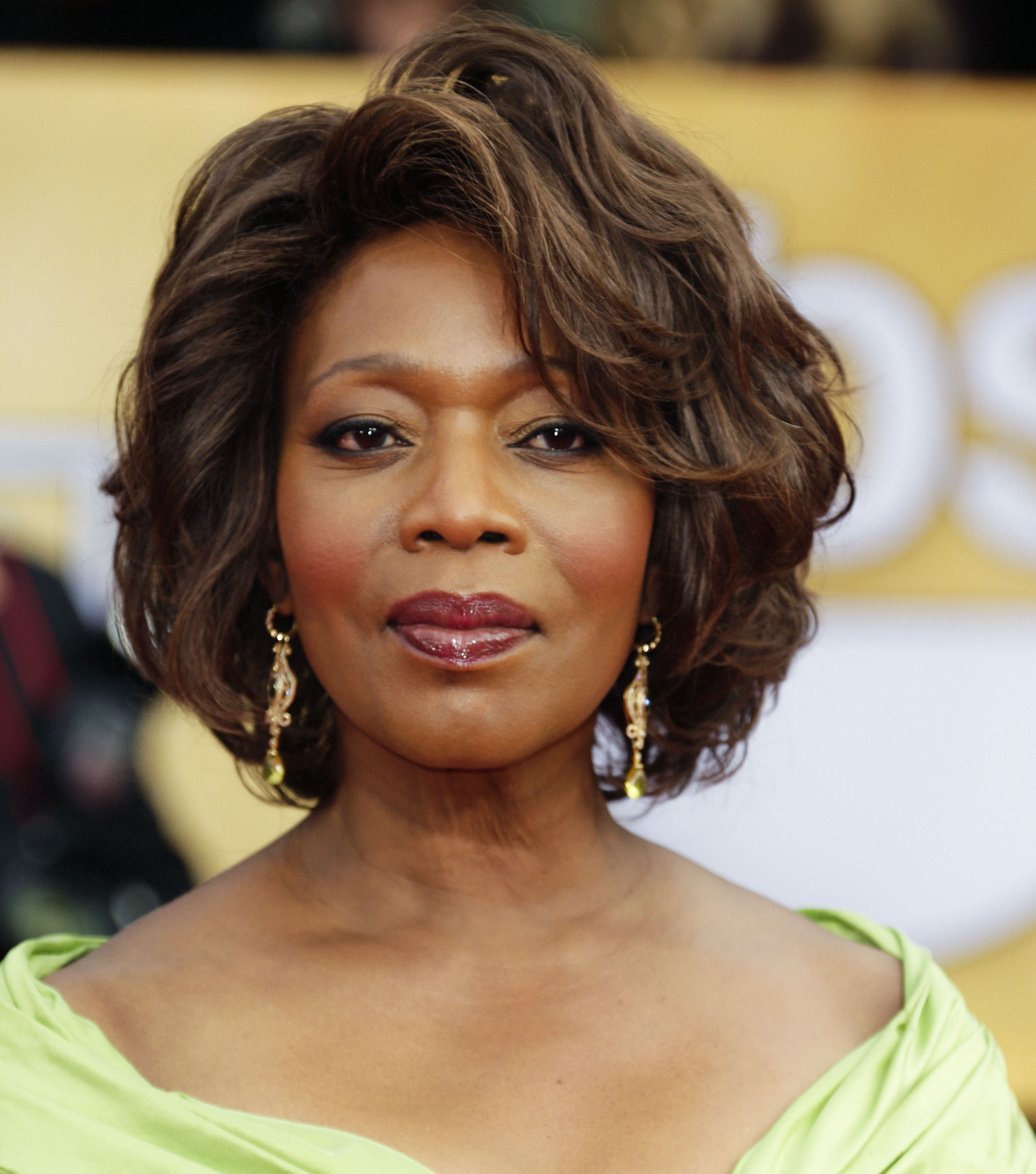
Alfre Woodard

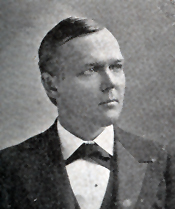
F. A. Woodard

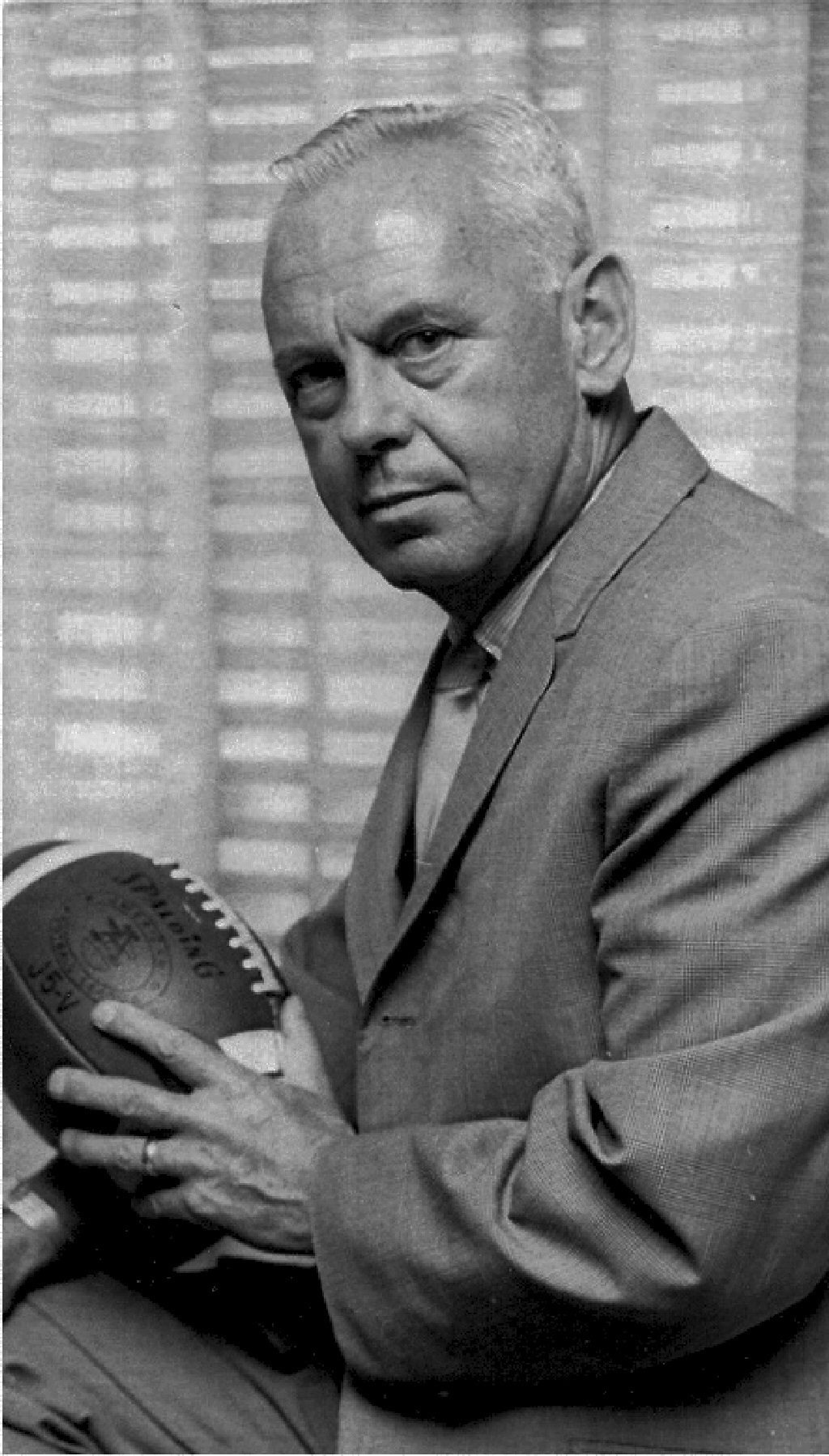
Milt Woodard

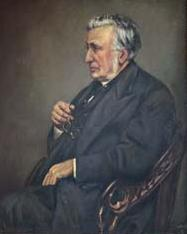
Nathaniel Woodard

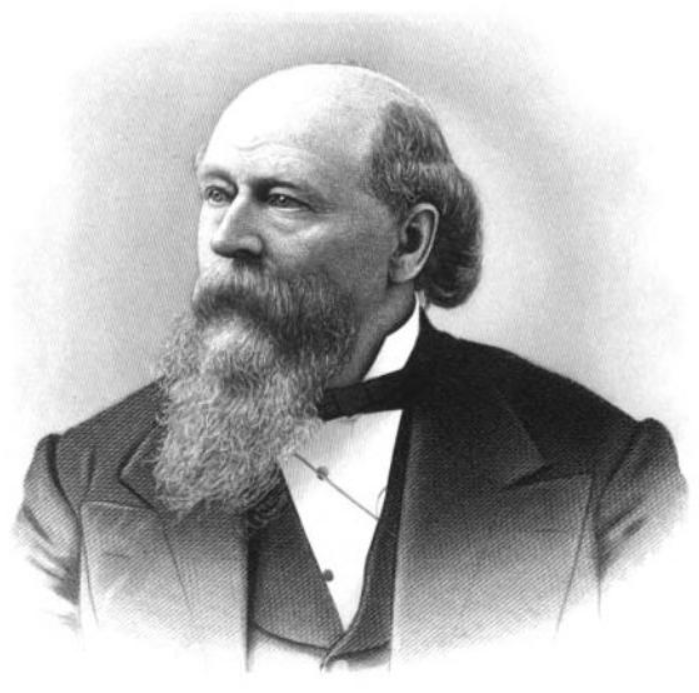
Willard Woodard

== Lists of people ==
=== By name ===
- Mike Woodard (disambiguation)
- Ray Woodard (disambiguation)

=== By title ===
- Senator Woodard (disambiguation)

== See also ==
- Woodards (surname)
- Woodward (disambiguation)
