= 1985 San Francisco Giants season =

1985 San Francisco Giants
- League: National League
- Division: West
- Ballpark: Candlestick Park
- City: San Francisco, California
- Owners: Bob Lurie
- General managers: Tom Haller, Al Rosen
- Managers: Jim Davenport, Roger Craig
- Television: KTVU (Hank Greenwald, Gary Park)
- Radio: KNBR (Hank Greenwald, David Glass); KOFY (Tito Fuentes, Armando Provedor)

The 1985 San Francisco Giants season was the Giants' 103rd season in Major League Baseball, their 28th season in San Francisco since their move from New York following the 1957 season, and their 26th at Candlestick Park. It resulted in the team finishing in sixth place in the National League West with a record of 62 wins and franchise-record 100 losses. This was the first, and as of 2025, the only time in the history of the franchise that they reached the triple-digit mark in losses. The Giants were managed by Jim Davenport, who was dismissed on September 18, after compiling a dismal 56–88 record, and Roger Craig, who guided the team to a 6–12 mark during the final 2½ weeks of the season. They finished 33 games behind the division champion and their main rival, the Los Angeles Dodgers.

== Offseason ==
- November 5, 1984: Guy Sularz was released by the San Francisco Giants.
- December 3, 1984: Doug Gwosdz was drafted by the Giants from the San Diego Padres in the 1984 rule 5 draft.
- January 26, 1985: Gary Lavelle was traded by the Giants to the Toronto Blue Jays for Jim Gott, Augie Schmidt (minors), and Jack McKnight (minors).
- February 1, 1985: Jack Clark was traded by the Giants to the St. Louis Cardinals for Dave LaPoint, David Green, José Uribe and Gary Rajsich.

== Regular season ==
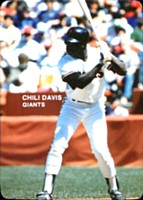
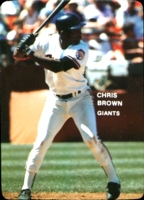
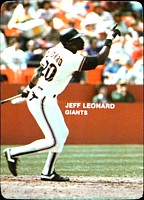
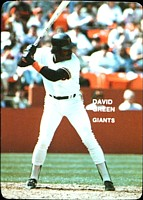
The Giants' Opening Day starters included (clockwise from top left) Chili Davis (RF), Chris Brown (3B), David Green (1B) and Jeffrey Leonard (LF).

=== Opening Day starters ===
- Bob Brenly
- Chris Brown
- Chili Davis
- Dan Gladden
- David Green
- Atlee Hammaker
- Johnnie LeMaster
- Jeffrey Leonard
- Manny Trillo

=== Season standings ===
NL West
Team	W	L	Pct.	GB	Home	Road
Los Angeles Dodgers	95	67	.586	—	48‍–‍33	47‍–‍34
Cincinnati Reds	89	72	.553	5½	47‍–‍34	42‍–‍38
Houston Astros	83	79	.512	12	44‍–‍37	39‍–‍42
San Diego Padres	83	79	.512	12	44‍–‍37	39‍–‍42
Atlanta Braves	66	96	.407	29	32‍–‍49	34‍–‍47
San Francisco Giants	62	100	.383	33	38‍–‍43	24‍–‍57

=== Record vs. opponents ===
1985 National League record Sources:
Team	ATL	CHC	CIN	HOU	LAD	MON	NYM	PHI	PIT	SD	SF	STL
Atlanta	—	5–7	7–11	8–10	5–13	3–9	2–10	10–2	6–6	7–11	10–8	3–9
Chicago	7–5	—	5–6	5–7	5–7	7–11	4–14	13–5	13–5	8–4	6–6	4–14
Cincinnati	11–7	6–5	—	11–7	7–11	8–4	4–8	7–5	9–3	9–9	12–6	5–7
Houston	10–8	7–5	7–11	—	6–12	6–6	4–8	4–8	6–6	12–6	15–3	6–6
Los Angeles	13–5	7–5	11–7	12–6	—	7–5	7–5	4–8	8–4	8–10	11–7	7–5
Montreal	9–3	11–7	4–8	6–6	5–7	—	9–9	8–10	9–8	5–7	7–5	11–7
New York	10–2	14–4	8–4	8–4	5–7	9–9	—	11–7	10–8	7–5	8–4	8–10
Philadelphia	2-10	5–13	5–7	8–4	8–4	10–8	7–11	—	11–7	5–7	6–6	8–10
Pittsburgh	6–6	5–13	3–9	6–6	4–8	8–9	8–10	7–11	—	4–8	3–9	3–15
San Diego	11–7	4–8	9–9	6–12	10–8	7–5	5–7	7–5	8–4	—	12–6	4–8
San Francisco	8–10	6–6	6–12	3–15	7–11	5–7	4–8	6–6	9–3	6–12	—	2–10
St. Louis	9–3	14–4	7–5	6–6	5–7	7–11	10–8	10–8	15–3	8–4	10–2	—

=== Notable transactions ===
- April 5, 1985: Roger Mason was traded by the Detroit Tigers to the San Francisco Giants for Alejandro Sánchez.
- April 6, 1985: Vida Blue was signed as a free agent by the Giants.
- April 15, 1985: Chuck Hensley was signed as a free agent with the San Francisco Giants.
- April 17, 1985: John Rabb was traded by the Giants to the Atlanta Braves for Alex Treviño.
- April 30, 1985: Jeff Cornell was released by the San Francisco Giants.
- May 7, 1985: Mike Jeffcoat was traded by the Cleveland Indians with Luis Quinones to the San Francisco Giants for Johnnie LeMaster.
- June 3, 1985: Will Clark was drafted by the Giants in the 1st round (2nd pick) of the 1985 Major League Baseball draft.
- July 22, 1985: Gary Rajsich was purchased from the Giants by the St. Louis Cardinals.

=== Roster ===
1985 San Francisco Giants
Roster
Pitchers: 14 Vida Blue; 13 Mark Davis; 50 Scott Garrelts; 51 Jim Gott; 7 Atlee Hammaker; 33,46 Mike Jeffcoat; 39 Mike Krukow; 40 Dave LaPoint; 19 Bill Laskey; 19 Roger Mason; 38 Greg Minton; 34 Bobby Moore; 49 Jeff Robinson; 43 Colin Ward; 47 Frank Williams	Catchers: 15 Bob Brenly; 26 Matt Nokes; 29 Alex Treviño; Infielders: 1 Ricky Adams; 52,35 Chris Brown; 25 Dan Driessen; 22 David Green; 10 Johnnie LeMaster; 26,43 Gary Rajsich; 41 Scot Thompson; 9 Manny Trillo; 23 José Uribe; 36 Brad Wellman; 41 Mike Woodard	Outfielders: 30 Chili Davis; 28 Rob Deer; 32 Dan Gladden; 20 Jeffrey Leonard; 34 Ron Roenicke; 8 Joel Youngblood; Other batters: 18 Duane Kuiper	Manager: 33 Roger Craig; 12 Jim Davenport; Coaches: 6 Rocky Bridges; 2 Chuck Hiller; 36 Tom McCraw; 48 Bob Miller; 42 Jack Mull

== Player stats ==
=== Batting ===
==== Starters by position ====
Note: Pos = Position; G = Games played; AB = At bats; H = Hits; Avg. = Batting average; HR = Home runs; RBI = Runs batted in

Pos	Player	G	AB	H	Avg.	HR	RBI
C	Bob Brenly	133	440	97	.220	19	56
1B	David Green	106	294	73	.248	5	20
2B	Manny Trillo	125	451	101	.224	3	25
SS	José Uribe	147	476	113	.237	3	26
3B	Chris Brown	131	432	117	.271	16	61
LF	Jeffrey Leonard	133	507	122	.241	17	62
CF	Dan Gladden	142	502	122	.243	7	41
RF	Chili Davis	136	481	130	.270	13	56

==== Other batters ====
Note: G = Games played; AB = At bats; H = Hits; Avg. = Batting average; HR = Home runs; RBI = Runs batted in

Player	G	AB	H	Avg.	HR	RBI
Joel Youngblood	95	230	62	.270	4	24
Dan Driessen	54	181	42	.232	3	22
Brad Wellman	71	174	41	.236	0	16
Rob Deer	78	162	30	.185	8	20
Alex Treviño	57	157	34	.217	6	19
Ron Roenicke	65	133	34	.256	3	13
Ricky Adams	54	121	23	.190	2	10
Scot Thompson	64	111	23	.207	0	6
Gary Rajsich	51	91	15	.165	0	10
Mike Woodard	24	82	20	.244	0	9
Matt Nokes	19	53	11	.208	2	5
Johnnie LeMaster	12	16	0	.000	0	0
Duane Kuiper	9	5	3	.600	0	0

=== Pitching ===
==== Starting pitchers ====
Note: G = Games pitched; IP = Innings pitched; W = Wins; L = Losses; ERA = Earned run average; SO = Strikeouts

Player	G	IP	W	L	ERA	SO
Dave LaPoint	31	206.2	7	17	3.57	122
Mike Krukow	28	195.0	8	11	3.38	150
Atlee Hammaker	29	170.2	5	12	3.74	100
Jim Gott	26	148.1	7	10	3.88	78
Bill Laskey	19	114.0	5	11	3.55	42
Roger Mason	5	29.2	1	3	2.12	26

==== Other pitchers ====
Note: G = Games pitched; IP = Innings pitched; W = Wins; L = Losses; ERA = Earned run average; SO = Strikeouts

Player	G	IP	W	L	ERA	SO
Vida Blue	33	131.0	8	8	4.47	103
Colin Ward	6	12.1	0	0	4.38	8

==== Relief pitchers ====
Note: G = Games pitched; W = Wins; L = Losses; SV = Saves; ERA = Earned run average; SO = Strikeouts

Player	G	W	L	SV	ERA	SO
Scott Garrelts	74	9	6	13	2.30	106
Mark Davis	77	5	12	7	3.54	131
Greg Minton	68	5	4	4	3.54	37
Frank Williams	49	2	4	0	4.19	54
Mike Jeffcoat	19	0	2	0	5.32	10
Bobby Moore	11	0	0	0	3.24	10
Jeff Robinson	8	0	0	0	5.11	8

== Award winners ==
- Mike Krukow P, Willie Mac Award

All-Star Game

== Farm system ==
Level	Team	League	Manager
AAA	Phoenix Giants	Pacific Coast League	Jim Lefebvre
AA	Shreveport Captains	Texas League	Duane Espy
A	Fresno Giants	California League	Wendell Kim
A	Clinton Giants	Midwest League	Tim Blackwell
A-Short Season	Everett Giants	Northwest League	Joe Strain

LEAGUE CHAMPIONS: Fresno, Everett
