= Woodard (disambiguation) =

Woodard is a surname.

Woodard may also refer to:

== Places ==
- 7549 Woodard, the asteroid Woodard, a main-belt asteroid, the 7549th asteroid registered
- Woodard Bay, Woodard Bay Natural Resources Conservation Area, Olympia, Washington, USA
- Woodard Family Rural Historic District, Wilson, Wilson County, North Carolina, USA

=== Facilities and structures ===
- Lee Woodard and Sons Building, Owosso, Michigan, USA; an NRHP-listed factory
- Lyman Woodard Furniture and Casket Company Building, Owosso, Michigan, USA; an NRHP-listed factory
- Lyman Woodard Company Workers' Housing, Owosso, Michigan, USA; an NRHP-listed tenement
- Thomas Woodard, Jr. Farm, Cedar Hill, Tennessee, USA; an NRHP-listed farmhouse
- Woodard Hall, Springfield, Tennessee, USA; an NRHP-listed mansion
- several NRHP-listed houses in Woodard Family Rural Historic District, Wilson, Wilson County, North Carolina, USA

== Other uses ==
- Woodard Schools, Anglican schools of the Woodard Corporation founded by Nathaniel Woodard
  - Sir Robert Woodard Academy, Lancing, West Sussex, England, UK

== See also ==
- Woodards (surname)
- Woodward (disambiguation)
- Woodyard (disambiguation)
