= Woodward =

A woodward is a warden of a wood. Woodward may also refer to:

== Places ==
United States

- Woodward, Iowa
- Woodward, Oklahoma
- Woodward, Pennsylvania, a census-designated place
- Woodward Avenue, a street in Tallahassee, Florida, which bisects the campus of Florida State University
- Woodward Avenue, a Michigan state highway
- Woodward Corridor, a neighborhood in Detroit, Michigan
- Woodward County, Oklahoma
- Woodward Park (disambiguation), multiple places
- Woodward Pond, a man-made pond in Bowie, Maryland
- Woodward Township, Pennsylvania (disambiguation), multiple places

== People ==
- Woodward (surname)

== Businesses ==
- Woodward, Inc., American maker of energy devices
- Woodward & Lothrop, American department store chain
- Woodward Iron Company, in Birmingham (Woodward) Alabama
- Woodward's, Canadian department store chain
  - The Woodward's building in Vancouver, British Columbia

== Education ==
- Woodward Academy, a private school in Georgia (United States)
- Woodward Career Technical High School, one of the oldest public high schools still in operation in the United States
- Woodward School for Girls, a private school in Quincy, Massachusetts (United States)

== Other uses ==
- 1947 Glazier–Higgins–Woodward tornado outbreak
- Dartmouth College v. Woodward, an 1819 U.S. Supreme Court case
- Woodward Camp, a youth summer camp in Pennsylvania
- Woodward Dream Cruise, a classic car event held in Michigan
- Woodward–Hoffmann rules, possible predictors of the stereochemistry of pericyclic reactions

== See also ==
- Woodard (disambiguation) (note different spelling)
- Justice Woodward (disambiguation)
- Woodyard (disambiguation)
