= Woodyard =

Woodyard may refer to:

== Surnames ==
- Alex Woodyard (born 1993), English footballer
- Earl Woodyard (1946–2015), American police officer
- Harry C. Woodyard (1867–1929), American politician
- Harry Woodyard (Illinois politician) (1930–1997), American politician
- John Robert Woodyard (1904–1981), American physicist
- Mark Woodyard (born 1978), American baseball player
- Nathan Woodyard, American police officer involved in the death of Elijah McClain
- Robert Woodyard Jr. (born 2003), American football player
- Sam Woodyard (1925–1988), American jazz drummer
- Terrence Woodyard (born 1982), American basketball player
- Wesley Woodyard (born 1986), American football player

== Places ==
- Woodyard, Maryland, United States
- Woodyard Archeological Site, Maryland, United States
- Woodyard, West Virginia, United States
- Woodyardville, Arkansas, United States
- Devil's Woodyard, mud volcano, Trinidad

== See also ==
- Woodward (disambiguation)
- Woodard (disambiguation)
