= Don Aase =

American baseball player (born 1954)

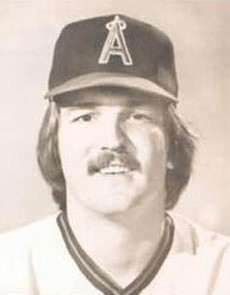
- Aase in 1978
- Pitcher
- Born: September 8, 1954 (age 72); Orange, California, U.S.
- Batted: Right Threw: Right

MLB debut
- July 26, 1977, for the Boston Red Sox

Last MLB appearance
- October 3, 1990, for the Los Angeles Dodgers

MLB statistics
- Win–loss record: 66–60
- Earned run average: 3.80
- Strikeouts: 641
- Saves: 82
- Stats at Baseball Reference

Teams
- Boston Red Sox (1977); California Angels (1978–1982, 1984); Baltimore Orioles (1985–1988); New York Mets (1989); Los Angeles Dodgers (1990)

Career highlights and awards
- All-Star (1986)

Donald William Aase (/ˈɑːsiː/ AH-see; born September 8, 1954) is an American former professional baseball pitcher who played in Major League Baseball from 1977 to 1990. During his MLB career, Aase played with the Boston Red Sox (1977), California Angels (1978–84), and Baltimore Orioles (1985–88), of the American League. In the National League, he played for the New York Mets (1989) and Los Angeles Dodgers (1990).

== Minor leagues ==
Aase was drafted by the Boston Red Sox in the sixth round of the 1972 amateur draft. That summer he struggled with the Williamsport Red Sox, putting up an 0–10 record to go along with a 5.81 ERA. The following season he was with the Winter Haven Red Sox and led the Florida State League with 15 losses. However, he bounced back in 1974 with the Winston-Salem Red Sox, leading the Carolina League in wins, complete games, and shutouts, and was named the circuit's Pitcher of the Year. Before being brought up to the Boston Red Sox, Aase's final minor league team was the Pawtucket Red Sox.

== Boston Red Sox ==
Aase reached the majors when he joined the Red Sox rotation in July 1977. He won his first big league game against the Milwaukee Brewers on July 26 and then threw a shutout against the California Angels five days later. He added another shutout against the Toronto Blue Jays on September 5 and ended his rookie year with a 6–2 record and a 3.12 ERA in 13 starts (a 146 ERA+).

== California Angels ==
Following his first season in the majors, Aase was traded to the California Angels for infielder Jerry Remy. He was primarily a starter in his first two and a half years with the team, notching 11 wins in 1978. In Game Three of the 1979 ALCS on October 5, 1979, Aase became the first member of the Angels to earn a postseason victory. In that contest, he replaced Frank Tanana in the sixth inning with a 2–1 lead over the Baltimore Orioles. He gave up runs in the sixth and seventh innings to blow the lead but still earned the victory when the Angels scored two runs in the bottom of the ninth to win the game and stay alive in the series.

Aase was moved to the bullpen in the middle of the 1980 season (he would never start another big league game after that) and was the Angels primary closer in 1981, notching 11 saves. However, in July 1982, he suffered an elbow injury that sidelined him for nearly two years. He came back in June 1984 and made 23 appearances for California, recording 8 saves.

== Baltimore Orioles ==
Following the 1984 season, Aase became a free agent and signed with the Baltimore Orioles. He won 10 games and saved 14 in his first year with the O's before putting up his best numbers of his big league career in 1986. That season, he saved 23 games in the first half and was named to the American League All-Star team. In the only All-Star Game appearance of his career, he came on in the ninth inning with runners on first and third and one out, and earned the save by inducing Chris Brown to hit into a game-ending double play. Later in the season, he began to show signs of overwork. On August 28, he became the first Orioles pitcher to lose two games in the same day, giving up game-winning hits to Dave Kingman in the first game of the doubleheader against the Oakland Athletics and then to Carney Lansford in the nightcap. Nonetheless, Aase set the Orioles' single-season saves record in 1986 with 34, surpassing Stu Miller's 27 saves in 1963. He held the record until Gregg Olson recorded 37 saves in 1990. His 34 saves were also at the time the record for a member of a last place team.

Aase's sole win in 1987 came on Opening Day, April 6, pitching an inning and a third of scoreless relief after replacing Mike Boddicker. After a few more relief appearances, he missed the rest of the season with shoulder surgery.

== New York Mets ==
With the season approaching, 34-year-old Aase signed as a free agent with the New York Mets on February 20, 1989. Aase made 49 appearances out of the Mets bullpen in 1989, posting a 1–5 record with a 3.94 ERA over 59 1/3 innings.

== Los Angeles Dodgers ==
Exactly one year after coming to terms with the Mets, Aase signed as a free agent with the Los Angeles Dodgers. Working out of the Los Angeles bullpen, Aase went 3–1 with a 4.97 ERA over 38 innings in 32 games. His final big league appearance came on the final day of the season, October 3 as the Dodgers hosted the San Diego Padres at Dodger Stadium. With the Dodgers trailing the Padres 4–3, Aase replaced Dennis Cook and allowed two unearned runs over one-third of an inning before giving way to Darren Holmes. Aase became a free agent after the season, but opted to retire.

== Career statistics ==
Career Pitching
W	L	G	GS	CG	SHO	GF	Sv	IP	H	R	ER	HR	BB	K	HBP	ERA	WHIP
66	60	448	91	22	5	234	82	1,109.3	1,085	503	468	89	457	641	7	3.80	1.39
