= Senator Woodard =

Senator Woodard may refer to:

- Duane Woodard (born 1938), Colorado State Senate
- John E. Woodard (1855–1928), North Carolina State Senate
- Mike Woodard (politician) (born 1959), North Carolina State Senate
- Willard Woodard (1824–1891), Illinois State Senate

== See also ==
- Senator Woodward (disambiguation)
- Senator Woodyard (disambiguation)
