= Ray Woodard (disambiguation) =

Ray Woodard is an American football player and coach.

Ray Woodard is also the name of:

- Ray Woodard (soccer coach) (1936–2009), Alabama soccer coach

== See also ==
- Woodard (disambiguation)
