= José Uribe =

Dominican baseball player (1960–2006)

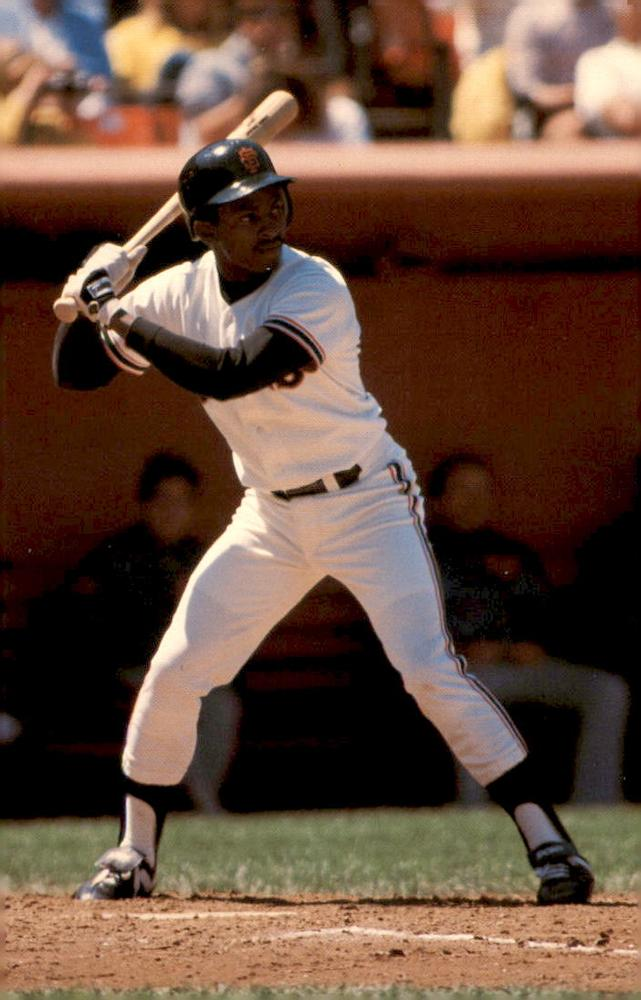
- Uribe with the San Francisco Giants c. 1988
- Shortstop
- Born: January 21, 1959; San Cristóbal, Dominican Republic
- Died: December 8, 2006 (aged 47); Santo Domingo, Dominican Republic
- Batted: Switch Threw: Right

MLB debut
- September 13, 1984, for the St. Louis Cardinals

Last MLB appearance
- October 3, 1993, for the Houston Astros

MLB statistics
- Batting average: .241
- Home runs: 19
- Runs batted in: 219
- Stats at Baseball Reference

Teams
- St. Louis Cardinals (1984); San Francisco Giants (1985–1992); Houston Astros (1993)

José Altagracia González Uribe (January 21, 1959 – December 8, 2006) was a Dominican Major League Baseball shortstop from 1984 until 1993. Most of his ten-year career was spent with the San Francisco Giants. He played for the Giants in the 1989 World Series against the Oakland Athletics.

== Minor leagues ==
Born in San Cristóbal, Dominican Republic, Uribe was signed by the New York Yankees in 1977, but was released shortly afterwards without even having played a minor league game with the club. He eventually signed with the St. Louis Cardinals in 1980, and after four seasons in their farm system, received a September call-up in 1984. In eight games with the Cards, Uribe batted .211 with three runs batted in and four runs scored.

== "The ultimate player to be named later" ==
In February 1985, Uribe, David Green, Dave LaPoint and Gary Rajsich were dealt to the San Francisco Giants for Jack Clark. Between the time of the initial trade and his delivery, he changed his name from José González Uribe (Uribe is his mother's maiden name; González is his father's name. (See Spanish naming customs) to just José Uribe because, as he put it, "There are too many Gonzálezes in baseball!" Thus, he was humorously referred to as "the player to be named later" and sometimes "the ultimate player to be named later", a quote attributed to coach Rocky Bridges.

== San Francisco Giants ==
Uribe was the Giants' principal shortstop for eight seasons, including their 1987 National League Western Division championship and 1989 National League pennant, leading the league with 85 double plays in the latter season. In the 1987 National League Championship Series he had a two-run single with the bases loaded in the fourth inning of Game 5, giving the Giants a 4–3 lead. He then stole third base and scored as the Giants won 6–3 for a 3–2 series lead, though San Francisco went on to lose the final two games. He won the 1988 Willie Mac Award honoring his spirit and leadership.

Uribe was also a fan favorite at Candlestick Park, where the home crowd had a unique chant for the relatively light-hitting infielder. When he would come to bat, fans on one side of the stadium would shout "OOH!" after which fans on the other side would respond with "REE-bay!". Giants fans would later use the same chant for Juan Uribe, José's second cousin. He also received the uncommon nickname José "Game Winning" Uribe from ESPN announcer Chris Berman when the stat known as the "Game Winning RBI" was an official statistic.

After an injury-plagued 1991 season, Uribe lost his starting job to Royce Clayton in 1992. He signed with the Houston Astros as a free agent for 1993, but only appeared in 45 games that season.

Seasons	Games	PA	AB	Runs	Hits	2B	3B	HR	RBI	Avg.	OBP	Slg.	SB	BB	K
10	1038	3369	3064	307	738	99	34	19	219	.241	.300	.314	74	256	425

== 1990 Fleer baseball card ==
For several years, Jose Uribe's 1990 Fleer baseball card was considered a "common" in a dramatically over-produced baseball set. However, in 2018, several of these cards began selling on eBay for hundreds of thousands of dollars with claims that they are rare.

According to eBay sold listings data, some copies of this card have sold for enormous amounts, though according to Beckett Media, those sales are dubious at best. Beckett has stated that there is nothing rare or uncommon about the card, and its exorbitant asking price in some auctions has no definable merit.

== Personal life ==
His first wife, Sarah, died at the age of 27 of a heart attack, two days after giving birth to their third child.

Uribe was killed, at age 47, December 8, 2006, in a car crash at about 3:00 a.m. near his hometown of Juan Baron, Palenque, Dominican Republic. He is survived by his second wife, Wendy Guerrero, with whom he had four children. He was a second cousin of former major league infielder Juan Uribe.

Preceded by Chris Speier	Willie Mac Award; 1988	Succeeded by Dave Dravecky
