= Jack Clark (baseball) =

American baseball player (born 1955)

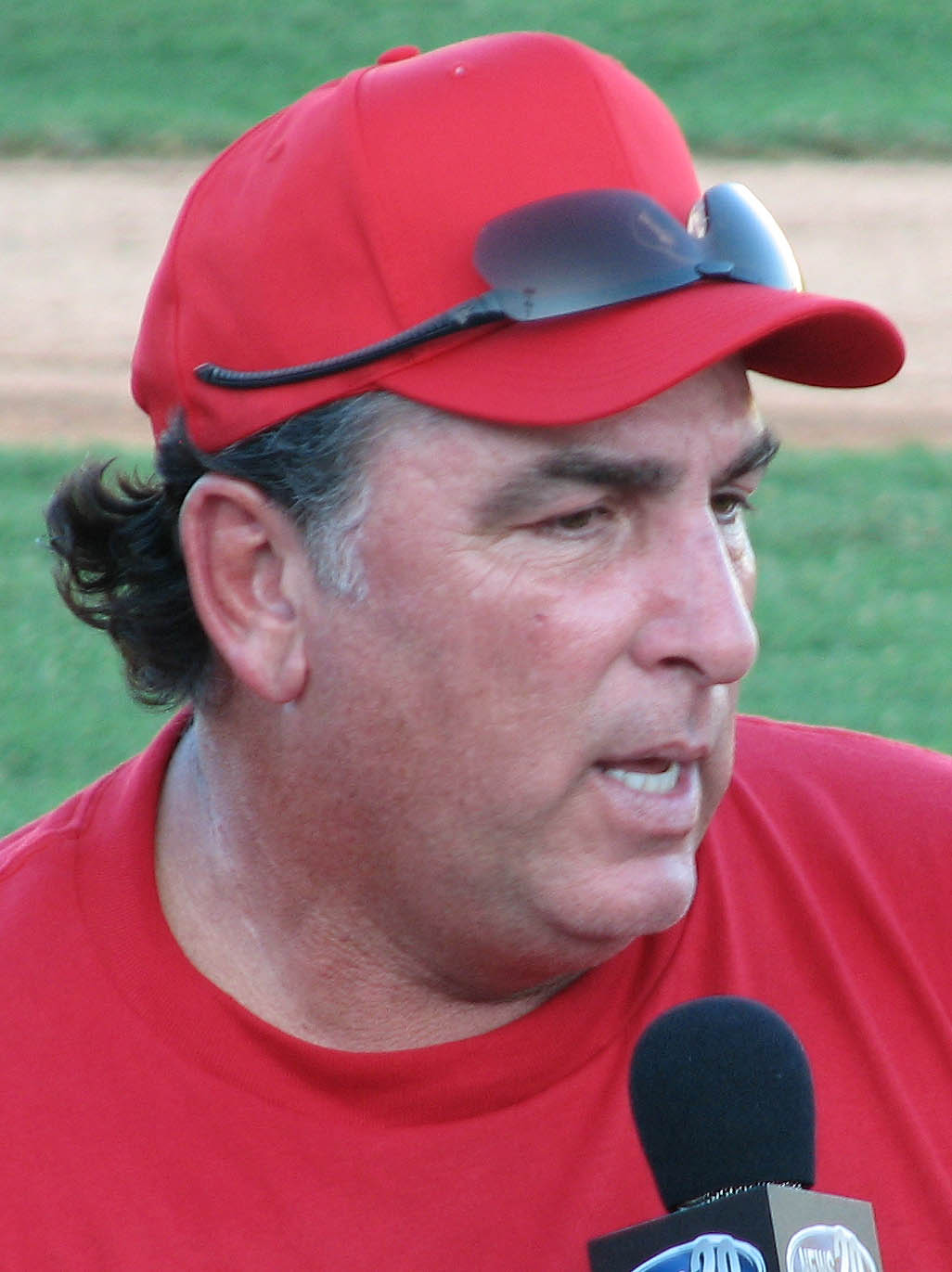
- Clark in 2008
- Right fielder / First baseman
- Born: November 10, 1955 (age 70); New Brighton, Pennsylvania, U.S.
- Batted: Right Threw: Right

MLB debut
- September 12, 1975, for the San Francisco Giants

Last MLB appearance
- August 28, 1992, for the Boston Red Sox

MLB statistics
- Batting average: .267
- Home runs: 340
- Runs batted in: 1,180
- Stats at Baseball Reference

Teams
- As player: San Francisco Giants (1975–1984); St. Louis Cardinals (1985–1987); New York Yankees (1988); San Diego Padres (1989–1990); Boston Red Sox (1991–1992); As coach: Los Angeles Dodgers (2001–2003)

Career highlights and awards
- 4× All-Star (1978, 1979, 1985, 1987); 2× Silver Slugger Award (1985, 1987); San Francisco Giants Wall of Fame

Jack Anthony Clark (born November 10, 1955), nicknamed "Jack the Ripper", is an American former professional baseball right fielder and first baseman. He played in Major League Baseball (MLB) for the San Francisco Giants, St. Louis Cardinals, New York Yankees, San Diego Padres, and Boston Red Sox from 1975 to 1992.

During his prime, Clark was one of the most feared right-handed hitters in the National League, winning the Silver Slugger Award in 1985 and 1987. A four-time All-Star In an 18-season career, Clark was a .267 hitter with 340 home runs and 1,180 runs batted in in 1,994 games. He also recorded 1,118 runs, 332 doubles, 77 stolen bases, 1,262 bases on balls and 1,826 hits in 6,847 at-bats. He batted and threw right-handed.

== Professional career ==
=== Minor leagues ===
Clark began his minor league baseball career in 1973 with the Great Falls Giants where he played the outfield and third base and had a 0-2 record in 5 games as a pitcher. In 1974, he led the league with 117 RBIs with Fresno. The following year, he led the league with 23 home runs with Lafayette.

=== San Francisco Giants (1975–1984) ===
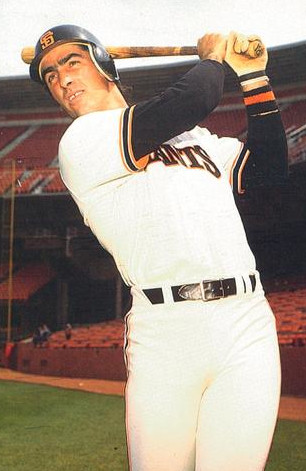
Clark with the San Francisco Giants

Clark started his major league career with the San Francisco Giants in 1975 as a right fielder and the youngest player in 1975 (19). His 26-game hitting streak in 1978 is the longest by a Giants player after 1900. He won the first Willie Mac Award in 1980 for his spirit and leadership.

On the other hand, Clark frequently complained about the cold and windy conditions at Candlestick Park, the Giants' home park. Described by one teammate as "a born star, but he didn't care about the birthright, [caring] about winning", Clark bristled at management firing Joe Altobelli in 1979 for continually starting over and called them a "loser" when Dave Bristol was fired in 1980 for Frank Robinson. He had a rift with manager Frank Robinson, and some members of the Giants front office thought Clark took too long to recover from injuries. The final straw came during a game in 1984 at the Astrodome, when Robinson played Clark despite a sore right knee. He elected to have knee surgery and refused to play the last month of the season.

=== St. Louis Cardinals (1985–1987) ===
On February 1, 1985, Clark was traded to the St. Louis Cardinals for shortstop José Uribe, pitcher Dave LaPoint, and first basemen-outfielders David Green and Gary Rajsich. He switched to first base to reduce risk of injury. His three-run home run against the Los Angeles Dodgers in game 6 of the 1985 NLCS was the pennant-clinching hit for the Cardinals.

Clark's fielding, never his specialty, played a pivotal role in the 1985 World Series. Umpire Don Denkinger's notorious controversial call in Game 6 came from Clark's throw to Todd Worrell at first. Clark would later misplay a foul popup that, while not ruled an error, should have been caught. Darrell Porter later admitted that he called off Clark but hesitated at the last minute when he thought Clark had called for the catch, which Clark had not. This opened the door for the Kansas City Royals to score two runs in the bottom of the 9th to win Game 6, and go on to capture the World Series in Game 7 the following night.

In 1987, despite a rift with St. Louis All-Star shortstop Ozzie Smith, Clark had his best season. He hit .286 with 35 home runs, 106 RBI, and led the league in on-base percentage (.459) and slugging percentage (.597). He accomplished all this despite missing 31 games due to nagging injuries and finished third in the MVP vote. Clark again led the Cardinals to the World Series that year, although an ankle injury limited him to one at-bat in the postseason.

=== New York Yankees (1988) ===
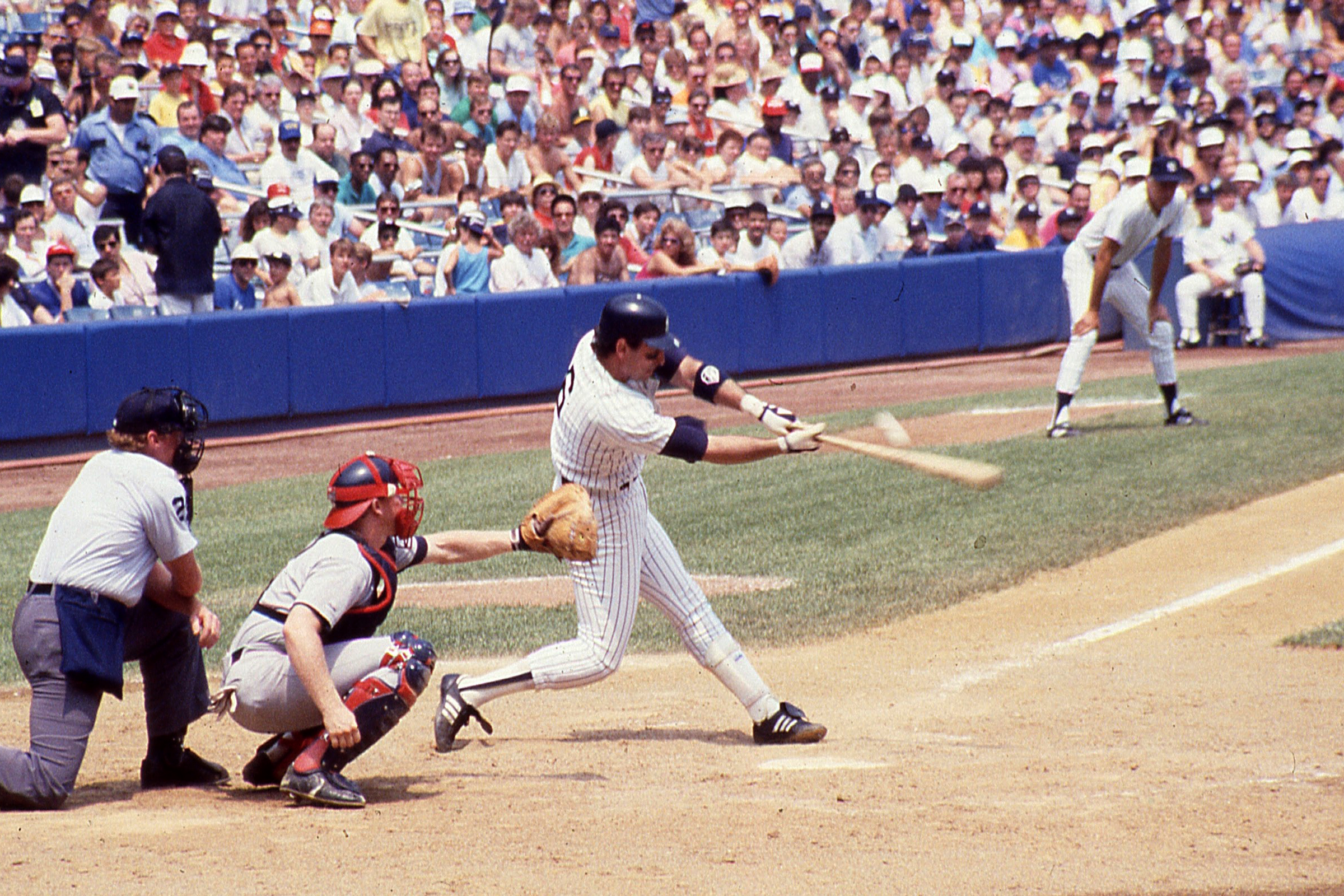
Clark playing for the New York Yankees in 1988

Clark signed a two-year contract with the New York Yankees prior to the 1988 season. He was primarily a designated hitter (DH), because of the presence of Don Mattingly at first base. Clark enjoyed playing for manager Billy Martin, but he didn't get along with Martin's successor, Lou Piniella. At the end of the season, he requested a trade.

=== San Diego Padres (1989–1990) ===
After the 1988 season, the Yankees traded Clark to the San Diego Padres with Pat Clements for Lance McCullers, Jimmy Jones, and Stan Jefferson. Regarding his time in the American League, he said, "I hate that damn league. Every game lasts 3 1/2–4 hours. No wonder the fans are bored over there." He played for the Padres for two seasons. In 1990, he feuded with All-Star teammate Tony Gwynn, who was widely respected by his peers and known as one of the most dedicated players in baseball. Clark called him selfish and stated that Gwynn should be swinging with runners in scoring position instead of bunting and protecting his batting average. "No one bothers Tony Gwynn because he wins batting titles, but the Padres finish fourth or fifth every year", he said (in the two seasons he played with the team, they finished 2nd and 5th, respectively). Joe Carter, who played for the Padres in 1990, said, "It just involved one great guy, and that's Tony Gwynn, and anything they want to say about Tony Gwynn is going to be news. It got all blown out of proportion." Gwynn countered, "I've been doing the same things my whole career, playing the same way. Now, why is it an issue? Because Jack Clark says it is."

In early 1991, after leaving the Padres, Clark called Padres manager Greg Riddoch "a bad, bad man, and he's sneaky. He's a snake. Well, not just a snake, but a s-s-s-n-n-n-a-ke." Clark said of the San Diego fans: "Everything that they should cheer for they'd boo for, and everything they should boo for they'd cheer for ... Tony, he's perfect for them. He just plays the whole thing up, and the town is so stupid that they can't see." Gwynn responded with his own criticism of Clark: "Let's talk about him walking 104 times, being a No. 4 hitter. Let's talk about his not flying on team flights. Let's talk about him getting booted out of games on a called strike three."

=== Boston Red Sox (1991–1992) ===
Clark returned to the American League in 1991, signing with the Boston Red Sox for three years over the Padres' offer of only one. Clark served primarily as Boston's DH, hitting 28 home runs his first year with the team.

=== Montreal Expos ===
After hitting only five home runs in a truncated 1992 season, Clark was waived by Boston in February 1993 and was signed to a minor league contract by the Montreal Expos during 1993 spring training. He was released later that year without appearing in a regular season game with the Expos, and retired shortly thereafter.

=== Retirement ===
Clark was named manager of the River City Rascals, a new Frontier League independent minor league team, in their inaugural season in 1999.

Clark served as the Los Angeles Dodgers' hitting coach for the 2001 through 2003 seasons.

In October 2008, Clark was named manager of the Springfield Sliders of the Central Illinois Collegiate League, which merged into the Prospect League for 2009. Clark caught criticism from an article in The State Journal-Register after missing ten of the Sliders' 26 home games with no telling how many road games he attended.

== Controversies ==
=== Bankruptcy ===
Clark was driven into bankruptcy in 1992 by his appetite for luxury cars. According to his bankruptcy filing, he owned 18 luxury automobiles, including a US$700,000 Ferrari and a Rolls-Royce. Clark was trying to pay 17 car payments simultaneously, and whenever he got bored with a car he would get rid of it and just buy another one. He ended up losing his US$2.4 million home and his drag-racing business because of his extravagant spending habits. Despite one of the most publicized bankruptcies in baseball, Clark reportedly got back on his feet in the late 1990s.

=== Talk radio ===
Clark was hired as a sports talk host on St. Louis radio station WGNU in August 2013, co-hosting "The King and the Ripper" with longtime St. Louis radio personality Kevin "the King" Slaten. At least twice during the show's first week, Clark accused Los Angeles Angels slugger Albert Pujols of using performance-enhancing drugs (PEDs) while Pujols was with the Cardinals. Clark had said that he talked to Pujols' former personal trainer and said that "I know for a fact he was" using PEDs. Pujols responded by threatening Clark and WGNU with a defamation lawsuit, and vehemently denied that he had ever used PEDs. The trainer added that he hadn't even talked to Clark in over ten years. InsideSTL Enterprises, who owned WGNU's weekday airtime through a time brokerage agreement, cut ties with Clark and Slaten after only seven shows. On October 4, 2013, Pujols filed a lawsuit against Clark. In response on October 14, Clark challenged Pujols to both take polygraph tests to resolve who is telling the truth. However, on February 10, 2014, Clark apologized and retracted his accusations against Pujols, saying he had "no knowledge whatsoever" that Pujols ever used PEDs. "During a heated discussion on air, I misspoke", Clark said. In return, Pujols dropped the suit.

== See also ==
- List of Major League Baseball career home run leaders
- List of Major League Baseball career runs scored leaders
- List of Major League Baseball career runs batted in leaders

| Preceded by Rick Monday | National League Player of the Month; May, 1978 | Succeeded by Dave Winfield |
| Preceded by Rick Down | Los Angeles Dodgers Hitting Coach; 2001–2003 | Succeeded by George Hendrick |
