= David Green (baseball) =

Nicaraguan baseball player (1960–2022)

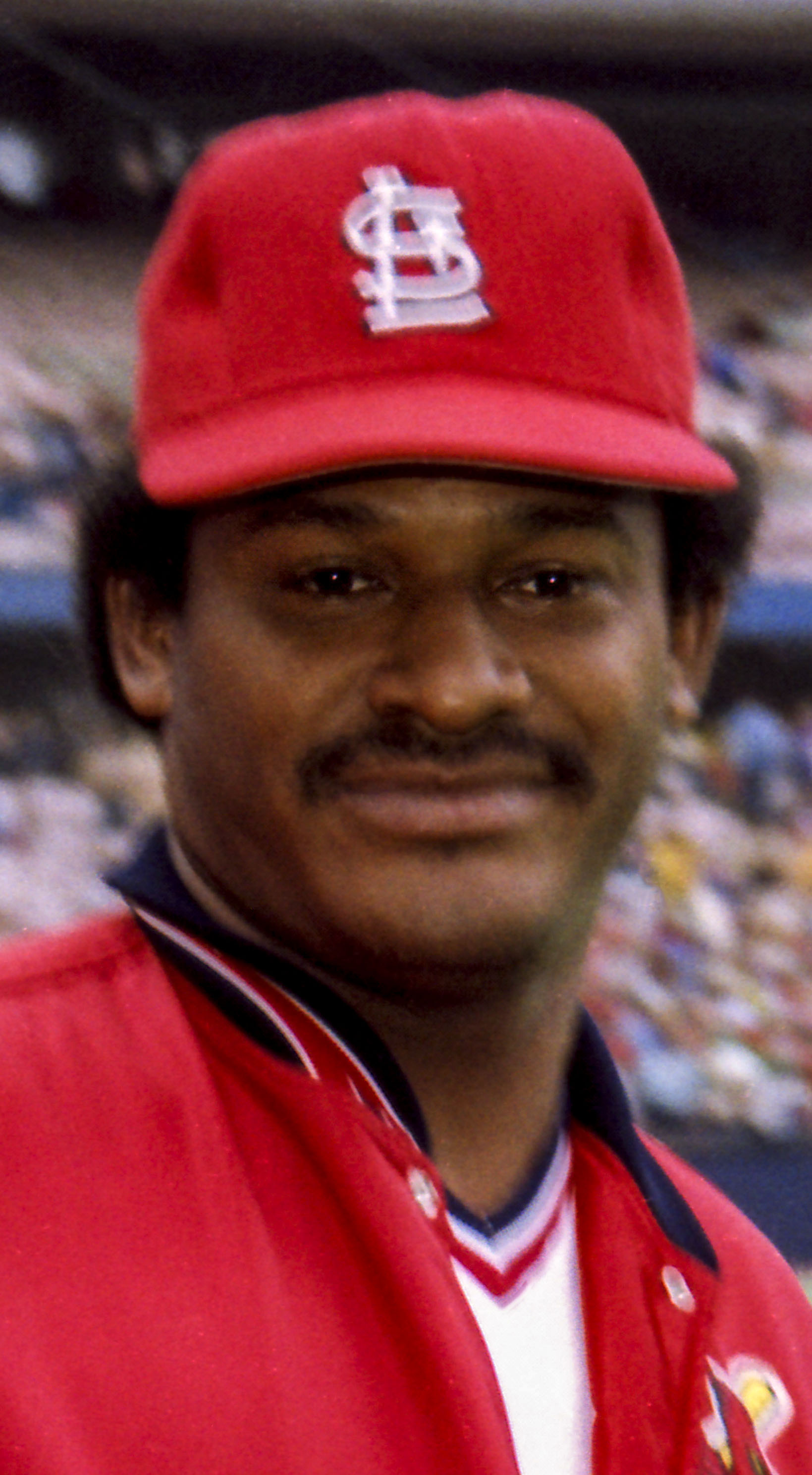
- Green in 1983
- First baseman / Outfielder
- Born: December 4, 1960; Managua, Nicaragua
- Died: January 25, 2022 (aged 61); Florissant, Missouri, U.S.
- Batted: Right Threw: Right

Professional debut
- MLB: September 4, 1981, for the St. Louis Cardinals
- NPB: July 6, 1986, for the Kintetsu Buffaloes

Last appearance
- MLB: October 4, 1987, for the St. Louis Cardinals
- NPB: October 10, 1986, for the Kintetsu Buffaloes

MLB statistics
- Batting average: .268
- Home runs: 31
- Runs batted in: 180

NPB statistics
- Batting average: .270
- Home runs: 10
- Runs batted in: 39
- Stats at Baseball Reference

Teams
- St. Louis Cardinals (1981–1984); San Francisco Giants (1985); Kintetsu Buffaloes (1986); St. Louis Cardinals (1987)

Career highlights and awards
- World Series champion (1982)
Medals
Men's baseball
Representing Nicaragua
Central American and Caribbean Games
Silver medal – second place	1978 Medellín	Team

David Alejandro Green Casaya (December 4, 1960 – January 25, 2022) was a Nicaraguan professional baseball player who was an outfielder and first baseman in Major League Baseball (MLB). Between 1981 and 1987, he spent parts of six seasons in the MLB. He was a member of the St. Louis Cardinals for five of those years, and he also spent one season with the San Francisco Giants.

== Early life ==
Green was born in Managua, Nicaragua, on December 4, 1960. He was one of ten children of Edward Green Sinclair and Bertha Casaya. His father, Edward (or Eduardo) Green, was a very successful baseball player in Nicaragua, as an outfielder for the Cinco Estrellas club of Managua and the Nicaragua national baseball team. Green was raised in a primarily Spanish-speaking home in the primarily Creole-speaking city of Bluefields. His sisters, Isabel and Carlota, were noted basketball players. Green is considered to have been born in 1960, although there has been some debate about his age.

== Professional career ==
=== Milwaukee Brewers (1979–1980) ===
An amateur free agent, Green signed a contract with the Milwaukee Brewers on September 24, 1978. He made his professional debut the following year with the Class A Stockton Ports of the California League. He appeared in 136 games for Stockton, batting .262 with 8 home runs and 70 RBI. Green spent the 1980 season with the Class AA Holyoke Millers of the Eastern League. He batted .291 over 129 games, hitting 8 homers and driving in 67 runs. Green's 19 triples were the most in the Eastern League that season.

=== St. Louis Cardinals (1981–1984) ===
Green was part of a major trade between the Brewers and St. Louis Cardinals, who later went on to face each other in the 1982 World Series. On December 12, 1980, the Brewers traded Green, Dave LaPoint, Sixto Lezcano, and Lary Sorensen to the Cardinals in exchange for Rollie Fingers, Ted Simmons and Pete Vuckovich.

For the 1981 season, Green was promoted to the Class AAA level as a member of the Springfield Redbirds. In 106 games with Springfield, he tallied a .270 batting average, 10 home runs, and 67 RBI. He was called up by the Cardinals during the September roster expansion that year, and made his MLB debut on September 4, 1981, at the age of 20, entering as a pinch hitter and being held hitless in two plate appearances in a 7–2 win over the Los Angeles Dodgers. Green was the youngest player in the major leagues that year, and batted only .147 during 21 appearances for the Cardinals. He earned his first MLB hit, an RBI single off Pittsburgh Pirates pitcher Luis Tiant, on September 26.

Green split the 1982 season between St. Louis and the Louisville Redbirds, who had relocated from Springfield. He batted .345 in 46 games with Louisville, while recording a .283 average in 76 appearances with the Cardinals. While facing Pirates pitcher Randy Niemann on August 15, Green hit the first home run of his MLB career. The Cardinals would go on to defeat the Brewers in the World Series that season, with Green batting .200 during the Fall Classic.

After splitting the 1981 and 1982 seasons between the Cardinals and their Class AAA affiliate, Green would not return to the minors until 1987. In 1983, he saw action in a career-high 146 games. He posted a .284 batting average, 8 homers, and 39 RBI, and he also recorded 34 stolen bases and 10 triples.

Green played in 126 games during the 1984 season. His average fell slightly to .268, and his stolen bases and triples decreased to 17 and 4, respectively. However, his home run total nearly doubled from the previous year, as he connected for 15 home runs and drove in 65 runs.

=== San Francisco Giants (1985) ===
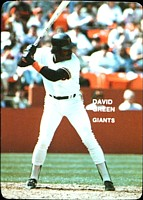
Green batting for the Giants in 1985

On February 1, 1985, the Cardinals traded Green, Dave LaPoint, Gary Rajsich and Jose Uribe to the San Francisco Giants for Jack Clark. Green made 106 appearances for the Giants during the 1985 season. He posted a .248 batting average, 5 home runs, and 20 runs batted in.

=== Milwaukee Brewers (1986) ===
San Francisco traded Green back to Milwaukee, on December 4, 1985. A week later, San Francisco received minor leaguer Héctor Quiñones to complete the trade. Green did not make the Opening Day roster, and was released on April 1. He was reacquired by the Brewers eight days later and was assigned to the Monterrey Sultanes in the Mexican League as part of a player-loaning deal between the Brewers and the Mexican team. Green batted .391 in 48 appearances with Monterrey.

=== Kintetsu Buffaloes (1986) ===
Green was acquired by a Japanese team, the Kintetsu Buffaloes of Nippon Professional Baseball, on June 24. Appearing in 67 games for Kintetsu, he tallied a .270 batting average, 10 homers, and 39 RBI.

=== St. Louis Cardinals (1987–1988) ===
Green rejoined the Cardinals organization on July 11. He saw action in 50 games with Louisville, and only appeared in 14 games with St. Louis. With the Cardinals, he batted .267 and hit one home run. Green played his final major league game on October 4, 1987, at the age of 26.

=== Career statistics ===
In 489 games over six major league seasons, Green posted a .268 batting average (374-for-1398) with 168 runs, 31 home runs, 180 RBI, 68 stolen bases and 84 bases on balls. He finished his career with an overall .986 fielding percentage.

=== Atlanta Braves (1989) ===
During the 1989 season, Green appeared in 34 games for the Greenville Braves, the Class AA affiliate of the Atlanta Braves. He batted .271, with 5 homers and 22 RBI.

=== Texas Rangers (1990–1991) ===
Green joined the Texas Rangers organization for the 1990 season. He saw action in only 16 games for the Class AA Tulsa Drillers, posting a .286 average. Green returned to Tulsa in 1991. He appeared in 59 games, and recorded a .285 average, 4 home runs, and 32 runs batted in. It was Green's final season as a professional baseball player.

== International career ==
Green played with the Nicaragua national baseball team for international competition. At the 1978 Central American and Caribbean Games in Medellín, Colombia, Green hit .470 with three home runs and nine RBIs over 12 games.

== Later life ==
After retiring from professional baseball, Green worked for the dog-grooming business of a friend. He was later employed in security around 2010. He was married, and had a daughter from a previous relationship during the 1980s.

Green died on January 29, 2022, at Christian Northeast Hospital near St. Louis, Missouri, of respiratory failure resulting from a choking incident the week prior. He was 61.

=== Involuntary manslaughter ===
In January 1995, Green was arrested on suspicion of drunk driving in a car crash in suburban Country Club Hills, Mo. According to the Post-Dispatch, a passenger in the car Green struck, Gladys Yount, 85, of Jennings, Mo., suffered a fractured pelvis in the accident and died of a heart attack two hours later. Green was charged with involuntary manslaughter and served six months in jail, the Post-Dispatch reported.

== See also ==
- List of Major League Baseball players from Nicaragua

Honorary titles
Preceded by Fernando Valenzuela; 1980	Youngest Player in the National League; 1981	Succeeded by Scott Garrelts; 1982
