= 1986 Major League Baseball All-Star Game =

1986 American baseball competition

	1	2	3	4	5	6	7	8	9	R	H	E
American League	0	2	0	0	0	0	1	0	0	3	5	0
National League	0	0	0	0	0	0	0	2	0	2	5	0
- Date: July 15, 1986
- Venue: Astrodome
- City: Houston, Texas
- Managers: Dick Howser (KC); Whitey Herzog (STL)
- MVP: Roger Clemens (BOS)
- Attendance: 45,774
- Ceremonial first pitch: Vice President George H. W. Bush
- Television: ABC
- TV announcers: Al Michaels, Tim McCarver and Jim Palmer
- Radio: CBS
- Radio announcers: Brent Musburger, Jerry Coleman and Johnny Bench

The 1986 Major League Baseball All-Star Game was the 57th playing of the midsummer classic between the all-stars of the American League (AL) and National League (NL), the two leagues comprising Major League Baseball. The game was held on July 15, 1986, at the Astrodome in Houston, Texas, the home of the Houston Astros of the National League. The game resulted in the American League defeating the National League 3–2 and ended a streak where the NL won 13 of the last 14 games. Boston Red Sox pitcher Roger Clemens was named the Most Valuable Player.

== Rosters ==
Players in italics have since been inducted into the National Baseball Hall of Fame.

=== American League ===
Starters
Position	Player	Team	All-Star Games
P	Roger Clemens	Red Sox	1
C	Lance Parrish	Tigers	6
1B	Wally Joyner	Angels	1
2B	Lou Whitaker	Tigers	4
3B	Wade Boggs	Red Sox	2
SS	Cal Ripken Jr.	Orioles	4
OF	Kirby Puckett	Twins	1
OF	Dave Winfield	Yankees	10
OF	Rickey Henderson	Yankees	6

Pitchers
Position	Player	Team	All-Star Games
P	Don Aase	Orioles	1
P	Willie Hernández	Tigers	3
P	Teddy Higuera	Brewers	1
P	Charlie Hough	Rangers	1
P	Dave Righetti	Yankees	1
P	Ken Schrom	Indians	1
P	Mike Witt	Angels	1

Reserves
Position	Player	Team	All-Star Games
C	Rich Gedman	Red Sox	2
1B	Don Mattingly	Yankees	3
1B	Eddie Murray	Orioles	7
2B	Frank White	Royals	5
3B	George Brett	Royals	11
3B	Brook Jacoby	Indians	1
3B	Jim Presley	Mariners	1
SS	Tony Fernández	Blue Jays	1
SS	Alan Trammell	Tigers	4
OF	Harold Baines	White Sox	2
OF	Jesse Barfield	Blue Jays	1
OF	José Canseco	Athletics	1
OF	Lloyd Moseby	Blue Jays	1
OF	Jim Rice	Red Sox	8

=== National League ===
Starters
Position	Player	Team	All-Star Games
P	Dwight Gooden	Mets	3
C	Gary Carter	Mets	9
1B	Keith Hernandez	Mets	4
2B	Ryne Sandberg	Cubs	3
3B	Mike Schmidt	Phillies	10
SS	Ozzie Smith	Cardinals	6
OF	Tony Gwynn	Padres	3
OF	Dale Murphy	Braves	6
OF	Darryl Strawberry	Mets	3

Pitchers
Position	Player	Team	All-Star Games
P	Sid Fernandez	Mets	1
P	John Franco	Reds	1
P	Mike Krukow	Giants	1
P	Shane Rawley	Phillies	1
P	Jeff Reardon	Expos	2
P	Rick Rhoden	Pirates	2
P	Mike Scott	Astros	1
P	Dave Smith	Astros	1
P	Fernando Valenzuela	Dodgers	6

Reserves
Position	Player	Team	All-Star Games
C	Jody Davis	Cubs	2
C	Tony Peña	Pirates	4
1B	Glenn Davis	Astros	1
2B	Steve Sax	Dodgers	3
3B	Chris Brown	Giants	1
SS	Hubie Brooks	Expos	1
OF	Kevin Bass	Astros	1
OF	Chili Davis	Giants	2
OF	Dave Parker	Reds	6
OF	Tim Raines	Expos	6

== Game ==
Wally Joyner was the first rookie to be elected to the starting team of an All-Star squad by the fans and the 15th rookie overall to actually start in a Midsummer Classic but the evening belonged to Roger Clemens. Roger Clemens made his All-Star Game debut and the game was held in his hometown of Houston. With help from Ted Higuera, Charlie Hough, Dave Righetti and Don Aase, Clemens shut down the National League and started his record setting All-Star Game career.

Clemens pitched three perfect innings, had no hits allowed and no walks allowed, which included only three balls and twenty-one strikes, against the formidable National League lineup earning him the All-Star Most Valuable Player Award. The National League pitching staff struck out twelve batters, a total equaled only three times before in All-Star History: 1934 All-Star Game [National League], 1956 All-Star Game [American League] and 1959 All-Star Game [National League].

In the second inning, Tigers second baseman Lou Whitaker followed a Dave Winfield double with a homer off Mets pitcher Dwight Gooden. By the fourth inning, Fernando Valenzuela had achieved five consecutive strikeouts. This tied him with the All Star record set during the 1934 All-Star Game by Carl Hubbell. Valenzuela struck out Don Mattingly, Cal Ripken Jr., Jesse Barfield, Lou Whitaker and fellow Mexican Teddy Higuera. In the seventh inning, Frank White pinch-hit for Lou Whitaker and hit an 0–2 pitch from Astros pitcher Mike Scott over the wall. White became the 14th player in the history of the All-Star Game to have a pinch-hit home run. The last player to do so was Lee Mazzilli at the 1979 Major League Baseball All-Star Game.

The National League made it interesting in the bottom of the eighth by roughing up Rangers pitcher Charlie Hough for two runs. In the ninth, the National League had runners at first and third with one out when Don Aase got Chris Brown to hit a check-swing grounder for a double play.

This was the last All-Star Game to be entirely played indoors until 2011, when it was played at Chase Field in Phoenix.

=== Coaching staff ===
Description	AL	NL
Managers	Dick Howser	Whitey Herzog
Coaches	Pat Corrales	Davey Johnson
Coaches	John McNamara	Tommy Lasorda
Honorary Captains	Charlie Gehringer	Rusty Staub

The 1986 All-Star Game turned out to be the final game that Dick Howser (then managing the defending American League and World Champions, the Kansas City Royals) would ever manage. Broadcasters noticed he was messing up signals when he changed pitchers, and Howser later admitted he felt sick before the game. Shortly thereafter, Howser was diagnosed with a brain tumor and underwent surgery. On June 17, 1987, Dick Howser died at the age of 51.

=== Umpires ===
Home Plate	Bruce Froemming (NL)
First Base	Steve Palermo (AL)
Second Base	Paul Runge (NL)
Third Base	Rick Reed (AL)
Left field	Eric Gregg (NL)
Right field	Tim McClelland (AL)

=== Starting lineups ===
American League				National League			
Order	Player	Team	Position	Order	Player	Team	Position
1	Kirby Puckett	Twins	CF	1	Tony Gwynn	Padres	LF
2	Rickey Henderson	Yankees	LF	2	Ryne Sandberg	Cubs	2B
3	Wade Boggs	Red Sox	3B	3	Keith Hernandez	Mets	1B
4	Lance Parrish	Tigers	C	4	Gary Carter	Mets	C
5	Wally Joyner	Angels	1B	5	Darryl Strawberry	Mets	RF
6	Cal Ripken Jr.	Orioles	SS	6	Mike Schmidt	Phillies	3B
7	Dave Winfield	Yankees	RF	7	Dale Murphy	Braves	CF
8	Lou Whitaker	Tigers	2B	8	Ozzie Smith	Cardinals	SS
9	Roger Clemens	Red Sox	P	9	Dwight Gooden	Mets	P

=== Game summary ===
Tuesday, July 15, 1986 7:35 pm (CT) at Houston Astrodome in Houston, Texas
Team	1	2	3	4	5	6	7	8	9	R	H	E
American League	0	2	0	0	0	0	1	0	0	3	5	0
National League	0	0	0	0	0	0	0	2	0	2	5	1
WP: Roger Clemens (1–0) LP: Dwight Gooden (0–1) Sv: Don Aase (1); Home runs: AL: Lou Whitaker (1), Frank White (1); NL: None; Attendance: 45,774, Time of Game: 2:28
