= Senator Woodyard =

Senator Woodyard may refer to:

- Harry C. Woodyard (1867–1929), West Virginia State Senate
- Harry Woodyard (Illinois politician) (1930–1997), Illinois State Senate

== See also ==
- Senator Woodard (disambiguation)
