= Mike Woodard =

Mike Woodard may refer to:

- Mike Woodard (baseball) (born 1960), American former professional baseball player
- Mike Woodard (politician) (born 1959), member of the North Carolina Senate
- Michael J. Woodard (born 1997), American singer and voice actor
