= Senator Woodward =

Senator Woodward may refer to:

- Asa Woodward (1830–1921), Connecticut State Senate
- Benjamin Woodward (New York politician) (1780–1841), New York State Senate
- Elbert A. Woodward (1836–1905), Connecticut State Senate
- F. A. Woodward (1852–1933), Arizona State Senate
- Jim Woodward (politician) (fl. 2010s–present), Idaho State Senate
- Rob Woodward (politician) (born 1968/69), Colorado State Senate
- William G. Woodward (1808–1871), Iowa State Senate

== See also ==
- Senator Woodard (disambiguation)
