= Woodards =

Woodards is a surname. Notable people with the surname include:

- Dan Woodards (1886–1964), English footballer
- Danny Woodards (born 1983), English footballer
- Victoria Woodards (born 1965), American politician

== See also ==
- Woodard (disambiguation)
- Woodard (surname)
- Woodards House, an historic building in Adelaide, South Australia
- Woodward (surname)
