= Dave LaPoint =

American baseball player (born 1959)

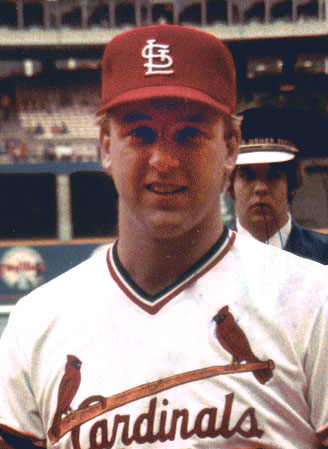
- LaPoint with the St. Louis Cardinals in 1983
- Pitcher
- Born: July 29, 1959 (age 67); Glens Falls, New York, U.S.
- Batted: Left Threw: Left

MLB debut
- September 10, 1980, for the Milwaukee Brewers

Last MLB appearance
- April 20, 1991, for the Philadelphia Phillies

MLB statistics
- Win–loss record: 80–86
- Earned run average: 4.02
- Strikeouts: 802
- Stats at Baseball Reference

Teams
- Milwaukee Brewers (1980); St. Louis Cardinals (1981–1984); San Francisco Giants (1985); Detroit Tigers (1986); San Diego Padres (1986); St. Louis Cardinals (1987); Chicago White Sox (1987–1988); Pittsburgh Pirates (1988); New York Yankees (1989–1990); Philadelphia Phillies (1991)

Career highlights and awards
- World Series champion (1982)

David Jeffrey LaPoint (born July 29, 1959) is an American former Major League Baseball pitcher. He was the manager of the Rockland Boulders, an American professional baseball team based in Pomona, New York, and member of the Canadian American Association of Professional Baseball known as the Can-Am League.

== Early life ==
LaPoint was born in Glens Falls, New York, and attended Glens Falls High School, where he was a star baseball player alongside future fellow Major League Baseball player David Palmer. He graduated in 1977.

== Professional career ==
=== Milwaukee Brewers ===
Drafted by the Milwaukee Brewers in the 10th round (237th overall) of the 1977 MLB amateur entry draft, LaPoint would make his Major League Baseball debut with the Milwaukee Brewers on September 10, 1980.

=== St. Louis Cardinals ===
On December 12, 1980, LaPoint was traded to the St. Louis Cardinals with Lary Sorensen, David Green, and Sixto Lezcano for Ted Simmons, Rollie Fingers, and Pete Vuckovich. He pitched in St. Louis until 1984, beginning as a long relief pitcher but eventually developing into a starting pitcher. LaPoint was a member of the St. Louis Cardinals team that defeated the Milwaukee Brewers in the 1982 World Series. He also finished eighth in the voting for the 1982 National League Rookie of the Year award.

=== San Francisco Giants ===
On February 1, 1985, LaPoint was traded to the San Francisco Giants with José Uribe, Gary Rajsich, and David Green for Jack Clark. He pitched in San Francisco for one season, making 31 starts.

=== Detroit Tigers and San Diego Padres ===
On October 7, 1985, LaPoint was traded to the Detroit Tigers with Matt Nokes and Eric King for Scott Medvin, Bob Melvin, and Juan Berenguer. After beginning as a starting pitcher, he was demoted to the bullpen where he pitched as a long relief pitcher. On July 9, 1986, he was traded to the San Diego Padres for Mark Thurmond. In San Diego, he pitched primarily as a long relief pitcher. He was released by the Padres on December 18, 1986.

=== Second stint with Cardinals and the Chicago White Sox ===
On January 19, 1987, LaPoint was re-acquired as a free agent by the St. Louis Cardinals. After beginning the season in the minor leagues, LaPoint was recalled near the trade deadline and pitched as a long relief pitcher, where he pitched poorly. On July 30, 1987, LaPoint was traded to the Chicago White Sox for Bryce Hulstrom. In Chicago, LaPoint became a starting pitcher again and posted a 2.94 earned run average. On November 9, 1987, he was granted free agency.

=== Pittsburgh Pirates ===
On February 9, 1988, he was re-signed by the Chicago White Sox shortly before pitchers and catchers were to report to Spring training. LaPoint pitched well in Chicago again, and began to draw interest from contending teams. On August 13, 1988, LaPoint was traded through waivers to the Pittsburgh Pirates for Barry Jones. He pitched well down the stretch for the Pirates, posting a 2.77 earned run average. On November 4, 1988, he was granted free agency.

=== New York Yankees ===
On December 3, 1988, LaPoint was signed as a free agent by the New York Yankees. LaPoint pitched poorly for the Yankees in 1989, winning only six games and posting an earned run average over 5.00. In 1990, LaPoint's fortunes improved as did his earned run average, moving to 4.11. He was released on February 17, 1991.

=== Philadelphia Phillies, Chicago Cubs, second stint with Brewers ===
On April 7, 1991, LaPoint was signed as a free agent by the Philadelphia Phillies. He played his final game in MLB on April 20, 1991, and was released on April 23, 1991. On May 9, 1991, LaPoint was re-acquired by the Milwaukee Brewers as a free agent to a minor league contract, reuniting him with the team that drafted him. He did not pitch well at Triple-A and was released on June 23, 1991. On June 28, 1991, he was signed as a free agent by the Chicago Cubs to a minor league contract. He pitched poorly and was not recalled when rosters expanded in September. He was granted free agency on October 15, 1991.

=== Minnesota Twins ===
After not pitching in 1992, LaPoint was signed to a minor league contract by the Minnesota Twins in 1993. After pitching poorly in Triple-A after making 13 starts, he was not recalled in September when rosters expanded.

=== Adirondack Lumberjacks ===
After sitting out the 1994 season, LaPoint pitched for the Adirondack Lumberjacks of the independent Northeast League in 1995. After retiring as a player, LaPoint was appointed as the team's pitching coach and eventually became manager. LaPoint parted ways with the team when they joined the independent Northern League in 1999.

== Managerial career ==
=== Bridgeport Bluefish ===
In 2006, LaPoint was hired as the manager of the Bridgeport Bluefish of the independent Atlantic League. He was the fourth manager in team history, and succeeded José Lind. After the 2006 season, LaPoint was named the Atlantic League Manager of the Year.

=== Long Island Ducks ===
LaPoint was the manager of the Long Island Ducks of the independent Atlantic League in 2007, 2008, and 2010, serving as the team's pitching coach in 2009.

=== Rockland Boulders ===
Starting in 2011, LaPoint managed the Rockland Boulders, an American professional baseball team based in Pomona, New York and member of the Canadian American Association of Professional Baseball known as the Can-Am League. He was fired after the 2012 season after the team who was once in the playoff race lost 10 straight games and eventually finished way out of the playoff hunt with a third-place finish.
