= Colin Ward (baseball) =

American baseball player (born 1960)

- Pitcher
- Born: November 22, 1960 (age 65); Los Angeles, California, U.S.
- Batted: Left Threw: Left

MLB debut
- September 21, 1985, for the San Francisco Giants

Last MLB appearance
- October 6, 1985, for the San Francisco Giants

MLB statistics
- Win–loss record: 0–0
- Earned run average: 4.38
- Strikeouts: 8
- Stats at Baseball Reference

Teams
- San Francisco Giants (1985)

Colin Norval Ward (born November 22, 1960) is an American former Major League Baseball pitcher. Ward played for the San Francisco Giants in 1985. He batted and threw left-handed.

He was drafted by the Detroit Tigers in the 3rd round of the 1982 amateur draft.
