= Bobby Moore (pitcher) =

American baseball player (1958-2015)

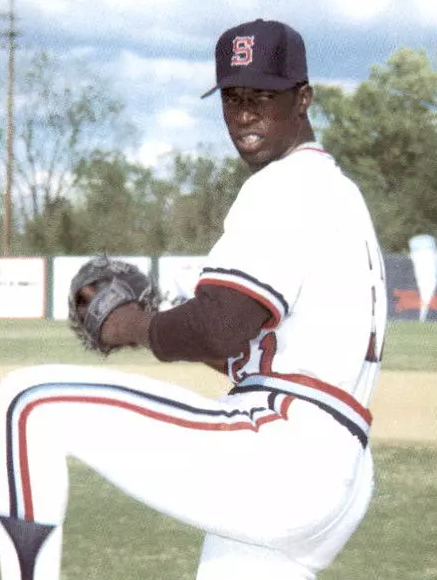
- Moore with the Shreveport Captains c. 1984
- Pitcher
- Born: November 8, 1958; Sweetwater, Louisiana, U.S.
- Died: April 10, 2015 (aged 56); Pensacola, Florida, U.S.
- Batted: Right Threw: Right

MLB debut
- September 11, 1985, for the San Francisco Giants

Last MLB appearance
- October 6, 1985, for the San Francisco Giants

MLB statistics
- Win–loss record: 0–0
- Earned run average: 3.24
- Strikeouts: 10

CPBL statistics
- Win–loss record: 0–1
- Earned run average: 4.50
- Strikeouts: 2
- Stats at Baseball Reference

Teams
- San Francisco Giants (1985); Wei Chuan Dragons (1992)

Robert Devell Moore (November 8, 1958 – April 10, 2015) was an American professional baseball pitcher, who played briefly during one Major League Baseball season with the San Francisco Giants, appearing in 16.2 innings through 11 games, compiling a 3.24 ERA.

He was originally signed by the Oakland Athletics in the 11th round of the 1976 amateur draft.

Bobby Moore played his first professional season with their Class A (Short Season) Boise A's in 1976, and split his last season between the California Angels' Double-A Midland Angels and the Cincinnati Reds' Triple-A Nashville Sounds in 1990.

All together he finished with a career minor league win-loss record of 55–86, both as a starter and reliever, with a 5.28 ERA over 1,223 innings pitched.
