= Chris Brown (baseball) =

American baseball player (1961–2006)

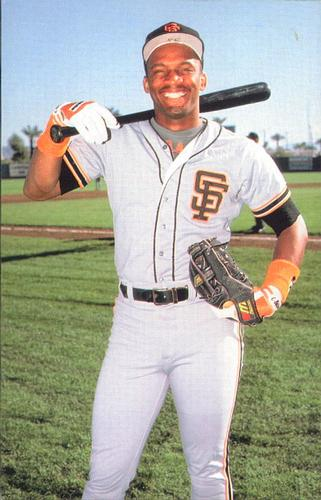
- Third baseman
- Born: August 15, 1961; Jackson, Mississippi, U.S.
- Died: December 26, 2006 (aged 45); Houston, Texas, U.S.
- Batted: Right Threw: Right

MLB debut
- September 3, 1984, for the San Francisco Giants

Last MLB appearance
- May 16, 1989, for the Detroit Tigers

MLB statistics
- Batting average: .269
- Home runs: 38
- Runs batted in: 184
- Stats at Baseball Reference

Teams
- San Francisco Giants (1984–1987); San Diego Padres (1987–1988); Detroit Tigers (1989)

Career highlights and awards
- All-Star (1986)

John Christopher Brown (August 15, 1961 – December 26, 2006) was an American third baseman in Major League Baseball during the 1980s, most notably with the San Francisco Giants.

== Biography ==
=== Early life ===
Born in Jackson, Mississippi, Brown was a graduate of Crenshaw High School in Los Angeles, California, where he played high school baseball with Darryl Strawberry. The 1979 Crenshaw High Cougars baseball team was the subject of Michael Sokolove's The Ticket Out: Darryl Strawberry and the Boys of Crenshaw.

Brown was selected by the Giants in the second round (44th overall) during the 1979 amateur draft.

=== Professional baseball career ===
==== San Francisco Giants ====
After a steady climb through the Giants minor league system, Brown made his major league debut for them in 1984 as a September call-up. In his first full season in 1985, Brown batted .261 with 16 home runs and 61 runs batted in (RBIs) for the last-place Giants, made the All-Rookie team, and finished fourth in the National League Rookie of the Year voting; Brown also led the NL in times being hit by pitch (11). In 1986, Brown batted .317 and made the NL All-Star team after hitting nearly .350 in the season's first half. The same season, he was involved in an infamous brawl.

At the end of 1986, he complained of shoulder soreness. That offseason, an examination by Dr. Frank Jobe in Los Angeles discovered that there was indeed a serious problem, and surgery was performed that winter. The following season, with Brown hitting a paltry .242 after 38 games, the Giants sent him packing on July 5 along with Keith Comstock, Mark Davis, and Mark Grant in a midseason trade to the San Diego Padres in exchange for Kevin Mitchell, Dave Dravecky, and Craig Lefferts.

==== San Diego Padres and Detroit Tigers ====
Brown's play declined further as the year progressed, and he ended the year with a .237 average; the Giants went on to win the NL West division, and the Padres finished in last place. After dropping to a .235 average in 1988 for San Diego, Brown was dealt to the Detroit Tigers and was out of baseball by 1989 at the age of 28. In his career, he batted .269 with 38 home runs, 184 RBIs, 164 runs, 410 hits and 21 stolen bases in 449 games.

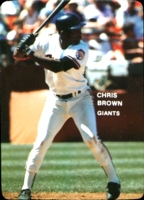
Brown batting for the Giants in 1985

=== Life after baseball ===
After retirement, Brown lived in Houston, Texas, with his wife Lisa and their two children, Paris Brown and Gordon Pickett. In 2004, Brown worked in Iraq driving an 18-wheel truck delivering diesel fuel for Halliburton. He took fire on numerous occasions, including in a convoy that was attacked on April 9, 2004, in which six Halliburton drivers and one soldier were killed, and another driver was kidnapped and later released. By 2006, Brown had returned to the United States.

Brown died at Memorial Hermann Hospital in Houston on December 26, 2006, nearly a month after he suffered burns in a fire at a vacant house he owned in Sugar Land, Texas. He was 45 years of age.
