= Woodward Park =

Woodward Park may refer to:

- Woodward Park (Fresno)
- Woodward Park (Tulsa)
