= Woodyard, West Virginia =

Woodyard
- Unincorporated community
- Location within the state of West Virginia Woodyard (the United States)
- Coordinates: 38°40′6″N 81°28′49″W
- Country: United States
- State: West Virginia
- County: Roane
- Elevation: 725 ft (221 m)
- Time zone: UTC-5 (Eastern (EST))
  - Summer (DST): UTC-4 (EDT)
- GNIS ID: 1741042

Woodyard was an unincorporated community in Roane County, West Virginia. Its post office is closed.

The community was named after William Woodyard, a state legislator.
