= Woodard Family Rural Historic District =

Historic district in North Carolina, United States

- U.S. National Register of Historic Places
- U.S. Historic district
- Location within North Carolina Location within the United States
- Location: Along US 264, near Wilson, North Carolina
- Coordinates: 35°41′30″N 77°50′18″W
- Area: 550.4 acres (222.7 ha)
- Built: 1832
- Architectural style: Colonial Revival, Greek Revival
- MPS: Wilson MRA
- NRHP reference No.: 86001657
- Added to NRHP: August 29, 1986

Woodard Family Rural Historic District is a national historic district located near Wilson, Wilson County, North Carolina. It encompasses 29 contributing buildings in a rural area near Wilson. The district developed between 1830 and 1911 and includes notable examples of Colonial Revival and Greek Revival style architecture. Notable buildings include the William Woodard House (c. 1832), the Woodard House (c. 1855), William Woodard Jr. House (c. 1850), and Elder William Woodard Sr. House (c. 1880, 1911).

It was listed on the National Register of Historic Places in 1986.
