= Pamela Woodard =

American radiologist

Pamela K. Woodard
- Education: Duke University
- Scientific career
- Workplaces: Mallinckrodt Institute of Radiology; Washington University

Pamela K. Woodard is an American radiologist specializing in cardiovascular imaging. She is the Elizabeth E. Mallinckrodt Professor of Radiology and the Director the Mallinckrodt Institute of Radiology at Washington University School of Medicine. She also holds appointments as a professor of Internal Medicine, Pediatrics, and Biomedical Engineering at the Washington University in St. Louis. She was elected a Fellow of the American Association for the Advancement of Science in 2022 and a member of the National Academy of Medicine in 2025.

== Early life and education ==
Woodard was born in Newton, Massachusetts. She has said that she wanted to be a physician from the age of four.

Woodard completed her bachelor's degree at Duke University. She remained at Duke for her medical degree, before moving to the University of North Carolina at Chapel Hill for a one year internship. Woodard was a radiology resident at Duke, where she studied blood clots in the lungs. She revealed that these blood clots could be detected by spiral CT scans. She moved to Washington University in St. Louis as a cardiothoracic fellow. Her research considered diagnostic radiology, including positron emission tomography, magnetic resonance imaging and CT scanning.

== Research and career ==
In 1997, Woodard was appointed to the faculty at Washington University in St. Louis, where she established multi-detector CT scanning as the standard means to diagnose blood clots. Her research has concentrated on translating pre-clinical imaging to patients. She has developed atherosclerosis agents and PET radiotracers. These radiotracers can detect proteins that are associated with plaques, which can cause sudden heart attack and stroke, or monitor blood flow through heart muscles.

Woodard was named the inaugural Hugh Monroe Wilson Professor of Radiology in 2019. In 2021, she was named the Radiological Society of North America Outstanding Researcher of the Year. In 2022, Woodard was elected a Fellow of the American Association for the Advancement of Science, and also elected as a Fellow of the American Institute for Medical and Biological Engineering. She has been a standing member of three National Institutes of Health study sections, most recently serving as the Chair of the Imaging Guided Interventions and Surgery section. She has served on the Board of Chancellors of the American College of Radiology, and in April 2024, Woodard was elected as President of the American College of Radiology for 2024–2025. In November of 2024, Woodard was chosen as President of The Academy for Radiology and Biomedical Imaging Research. The Academy is a non-profit organization committed to advancing federal support of the NIH, and it was instrumental in advocating for the establishment of NIH's National Institute of Biomedical Imaging and Bioengineering in 2001. In February of 2025, Woodard was named as the Chair of the Board of Trustees of the Research and Education (R&E) Foundation of the Radiological Society of North America (RSNA). The R&E Foundation invests in the future of radiology by developing investigators and supporting biomedical imaging research through grant funding. In September of 2025, Woodard was awarded a gold medal by the North American Society for Cardiovascular Imaging in recognition of her career contributions to cardiac imaging.

== Selected publications ==
- Paul D Stein; Sarah E Fowler; Lawrence R Goodman; et al. (June 1, 2006). "Multidetector computed tomography for acute pulmonary embolism". The New England Journal of Medicine. 354 (22): 2317–2327. doi:10.1056/nejmoa052367. ISSN 0028-4793. PMID 16738268. Wikidata Q34532556.
- W Gregory Hundley; David A Bluemke; J Paul Finn; et al. (June 8, 2010). "ACCF/ACR/AHA/NASCI/SCMR 2010 expert consensus document on cardiovascular magnetic resonance: a report of the American College of Cardiology Foundation Task Force on Expert Consensus Documents". Journal of the American College of Cardiology. 55 (23): 2614–62. doi:10.1016/j.jacc.2009.11.011. ISSN 0735-1097. PMC 3042771. PMID 20513610. Wikidata Q57736172.
- Chiles C; Woodard PK; Gutierrez FR; Link KM (March 1, 2001). "Metastatic involvement of the heart and pericardium: CT and MR imaging". RadioGraphics. 21 (2): 439–449. doi:10.1148/radiographics.21.2.g01mr15439. ISSN 0271-5333. PMID 11259706. Wikidata Q34190238.
