= Lee Woodard and Sons Building =

- U.S. National Register of Historic Places
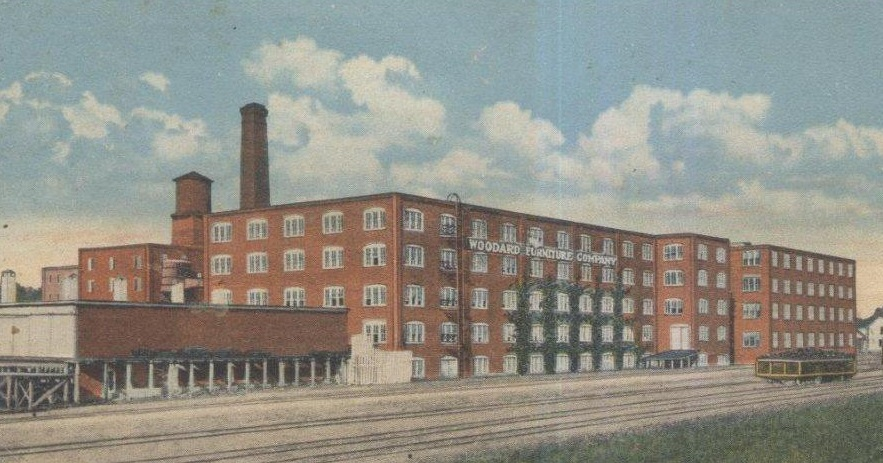
- Interactive map
- Location: 306 S. Elm St., Owosso, Michigan
- Coordinates: 42°59′42″N 84°10′42″W
- Area: 5 acres (2.0 ha)
- Built: 1900
- MPS: Owosso MRA
- NRHP reference No.: 80001914
- Added to NRHP: November 4, 1980

The Lee Woodard and Sons Building is a former factory building located at 306 South Elm Street in Owosso, Michigan, USA. It was listed on the National Register of Historic Places in 1980. It is now Woodard Station Lofts.

== History ==
By 1900, Lyman Woodard's Furniture and Casket Company had grown large enough to warrant constructing an additional building. Woodard built a large four story brick factory building directly adjacent to his existing plant and began equipping it. Unfortunately, demand for finished wood products began to decline. In 1904, Lyman Woodard died, causing a crisis at the firm. His son, Lee, stepped in to restore the company's health. When woodworking products failed to revive the company, Woodard turned to metal furniture and converted the factory's equipment. By the mid-1920s, Woodard was again prominent in the furniture-making business and began constructing an addition to the factory.

The Great Depression took its toll and, by 1942, the Woodard Furniture Company had liquidated its assets. In 1942, Lee Woodard converted the factory to make components for the war effort. After the war, he resumed furniture production, concentrating on metal furniture. Production continued for the next few decades and, in 1995, the company moved its factory and offices into a new building. Later, the original 1900 building was converted into loft housing, containing commercial space and residential lofts.

== Description ==
The Lee Woodard and Sons Building is a large four-story brick factory. The building has tripled sets of four-over-four double hung sash windows in bowed arch brick openings. The only details on the exterior are brick pilasters at two bay intervals and a simple dentilated brick corniceline. A c. 1925 addition is ten bays wide and has the same basic window pattern, but with windows in trabeated brick openings.
