= Woodward Township, Pennsylvania =

Woodward Township is the name of several places in the U.S. state of Pennsylvania:

- Woodward Township, Clearfield County, Pennsylvania
- Woodward Township, Clinton County, Pennsylvania
- Woodward Township, Lycoming County, Pennsylvania
