= John E. Woodard =

American politician and lawyer (1855–1928)

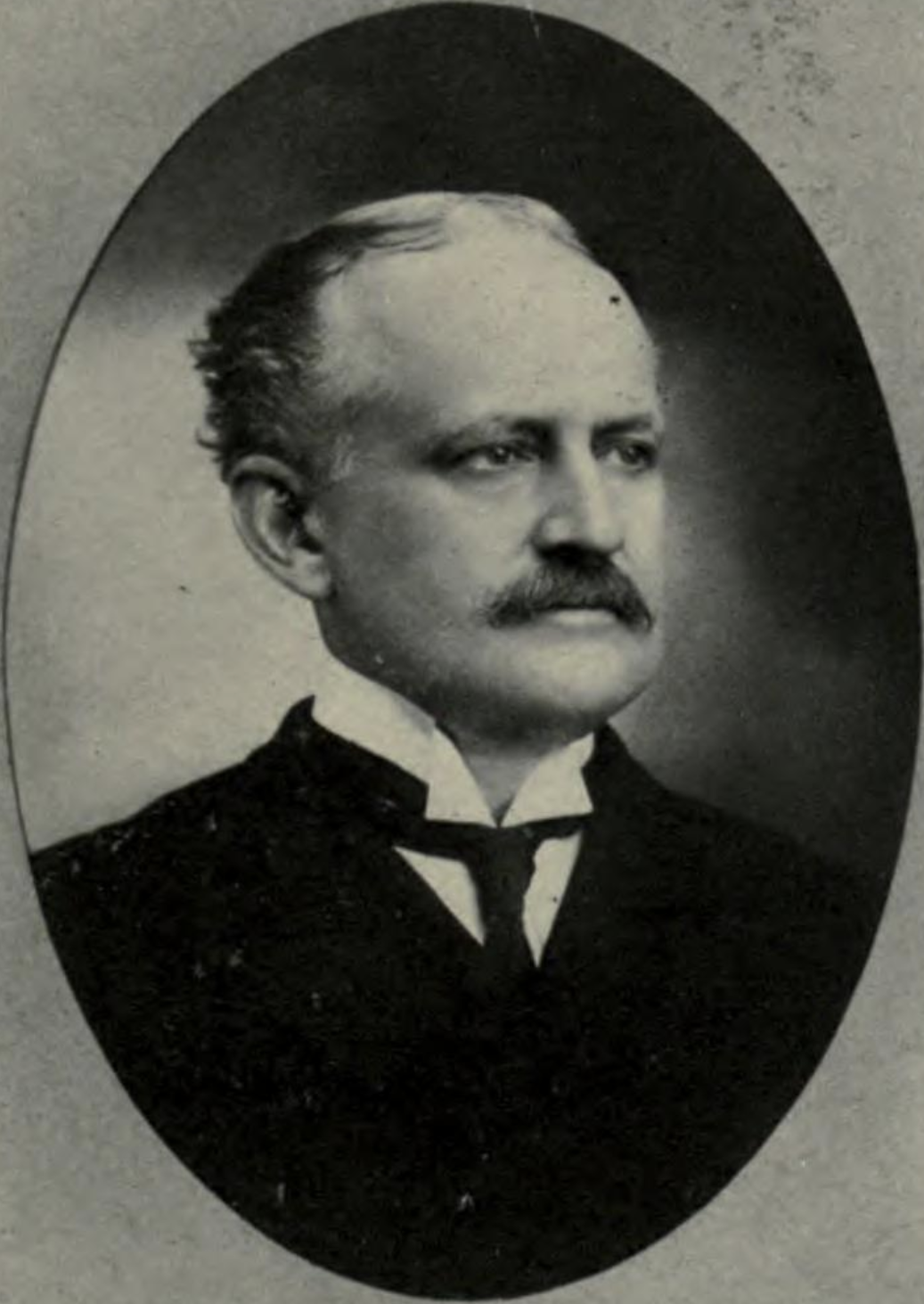
- Woodard in 1904 publication

Member of the North Carolina Senate from the 7th district
- In office 1900–1904

Member of the North Carolina House of Representatives from the Wilson County district
- In office 1884–1885

Personal details
- Born: John Exum Woodard; May 8, 1855 Wilson County, North Carolina, U.S.
- Died: March 4, 1928 (aged 72) Wilson, North Carolina, U.S.
- Resting place: Maplewood Cemetery
- Party: Democratic
- Spouse(s): Mary Lee Raffin (m. 1878; died 1916) Frances Jordan (m. 1917)
- Children: 5
- Education: University of Virginia
- Occupation: Politician; lawyer; newspaper editor
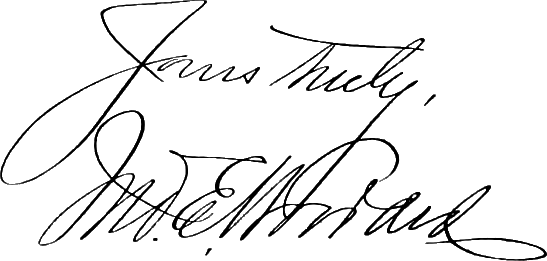
- Signature

John Exum Woodard (May 8, 1855 – March 4, 1928) was an American politician and lawyer from North Carolina. He served as mayor of Wilson, North Carolina, in 1882. He served as a member of the North Carolina House of Representatives from 1884 to 1885 and as a member of the North Carolina Senate, representing the 7th district from 1900 to 1904.

== Early life ==
John Exum Woodard was born on May 8, 1855, in Wilson County, North Carolina, to Winifred (née Exum) and Calvin Woodard. He was educated at the Wilson Male Academy and graduated from the Wilson Collegiate Institute in 1873. He studied for two years and graduated from the University of Virginia in 1875. He read law with his uncle James S. Woodard at his office in Wilson. He then entered the law school of Richard M. Pearson in Richmond Hill. He was licensed to practice law by the supreme court of North Carolina in 1877. He was a member of the Zeta Pi Society in college.

== Career ==
After graduating, Woodard practiced law in Wilson. He practiced law with Henry Grover Connor under the firm Connor & Woodard. He was elected solicitor of the inferior court in Wilson in 1877. He stayed in that role until 1882 or 1885. Later in 1890, he was elected solicitor of the third judicial district of North Carolina. He served in that role from 1891 to 1895. He was a criminal lawyer. He worked as a lawyer until a few months before his death.

Woodard was elected mayor of Wilson in 1882. He served as a member of the North Carolina House of Representatives, representing Wilson County, from 1884 to 1885. He was a member of the committee on the judiciary, privileges and elections and served as chairman of the committee on salaries and fees. In 1888, Woodard served as presidential elector for the second congressional district of North Carolina. He was elected to the North Carolina Senate in 1900, representing the 7th district. He was re-elected in 1902. He served as chairman of the judiciary committee. He was a delegate to the 1904 Democratic National Convention.

In 1885, Woodard was elected trustee of the University of North Carolina. He held that role for eight years. He served as editor of the weekly newspaper Wilson Advance.

== Personal life ==
Woodard married Mary Lee Raffin of Greene County in July 1878. They had five children, Thomas Ruffin, John Exum Jr., Delzell Ruffin, Mary Lee and Etheldred Henry. His wife died in 1916. He married Frances Jordan of Caswell County, North Carolina, on November 4, 1917. Woodard was a vestryman of St. Timothy's Episcopal Church.

Woodard died on March 4, 1928, at his home in Wilson. He was buried at Maplewood Cemetery.
