= Willard Woodard =

American politician

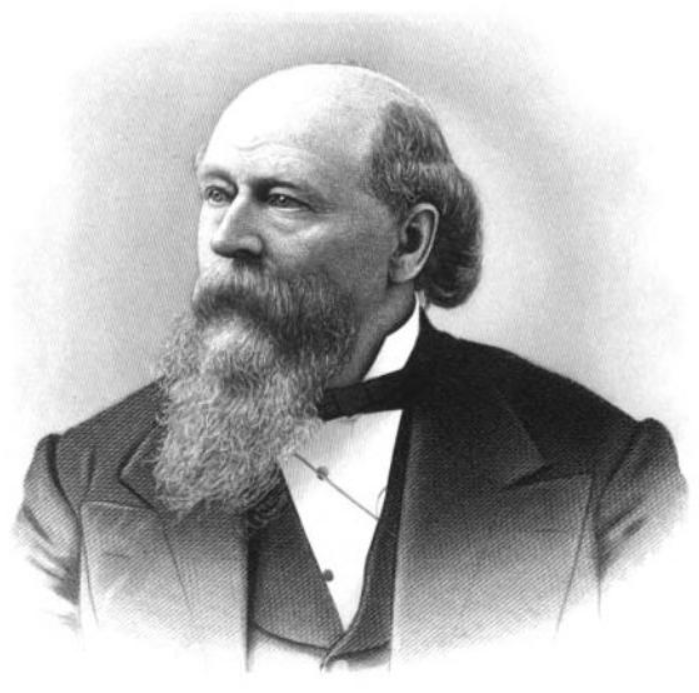

Member of the Illinois Senate from the 25th district
- In office 1870 – 1872
- Preceded by: Francis A. Eastman

Chicago Alderman
- In office 1869 – 1870
- Constituency: 12th ward
- In office 1864 – 1869
- Constituency: 9th ward

Personal details
- Born: December 12, 1824 Sandwich, Massachusetts
- Died: March 19, 1891 (aged 66)
- Party: Republican
- Other political affiliations: Free Soil Party; Liberal Republican Party
- Parents: Joseph Woodard (1797–1847) (father); Esther Pike (1805–1847) (mother)
- Relatives: Daniel P. Woodard
- Profession: Educator, publisher

Willard Woodard (December 12, 1824 – March 19, 1891) was an American politician, publisher, and parks advocate from Massachusetts. Raised in Hopkinton, Woodard founded a store there and rose to several local political positions. After a move to Chicago, Illinois, Woodard was named principal of a school. He later joined a publishing house and served on the Chicago City Council. Woodard served one term as an Illinois State Senator, then was named president of the West Parks Commission, overseeing the development of Chicago's park system.

== Biography ==
Willard Woodard was born 12 December 1824 in Sandwich, Massachusetts, to Joseph Woodard (1797–1847) and Esther Woodard (née Pike) (1805–1847). When an infant, his parents moved to Hopkinton, Massachusetts. Woodard assisted on the family farm there during his youth. He first attended public school, then received private schooling at an academy. Woodard apprenticed as a bootmaker, practicing in the summer while teaching in the winter. He opened a business in Hopkinton when he reached adulthood, quickly rising to local prominence. He was elected town clerk, school commissioner, and tax assessor. Woodard co-founded a Free Soil club and was named its first president.

Woodard opened a book, drug, and jewelry store in Hopkinton when he was twenty-five. In 1856, after seven years in business, he decided to close it move to Chicago, Illinois. He was named principal of the Jones School the same year that he arrived, leading it for eight years. He entered the George Sherwood & Co. publishing house, later becoming a partner in the business. Woodard was also elected alderman of the Chicago City Council from the 9th ward. He was re-elected every year until 1871, often serving on the committee on public schools. He was elected to the Illinois Senate in 1870, serving a two-year term. There, Woodard advocated for prohibition and increased observance of the Sabbath.

After the Great Chicago Fire of 1871, Woodard was one of the Committee of Seventy that oversaw the enforcement of law and order. Woodard was the Liberal Republican Party nominee for the United States House of Representatives from his district in 1872, but was unsuccessful. He then retired from politics. In 1877, Governor Shelby Moore Cullom named Woodard a member of the West Parks Board of Commissioners. He was soon named president of the board and donated his salary to the parks system.

Woodard married Levina J. Ellery, a descendant of William Ellery, in 1856. They had one son (Charles Sumner) and two daughters (Flora A. & Jennie E.). He was also an inaugural member of the Board of Trustees of the City Library of Chicago and was a trustee of the Chicago Washingtonian Home for Inebriates. Woodard liked to write in his free time and was a member of the Irving, LaSalle, and Massachusetts Clubs. He attended the Church of the Redeemer, a Universalist church, and oversaw its Sunday school for twenty-five years. Woodard died suddenly on March 19, 1891. He had been ill, but it was not thought to have been serious.
