= Ray Woodard (soccer coach) =

American soccer player and coach

Personal information
- Nationality: United States
- Born: Raymond Woodard; July 20, 1936
- Died: July 16, 2009 (aged 72) Shelby, Alabama

Raymond "Ray" Woodard (July 20, 1936 – July 16, 2009) was an American soccer player and longtime coach at Indian Springs School in Shelby County, Alabama, and has been called the "father of soccer in Alabama". He was the "first 'A' licensed coach" and Director of Coaching for Alabama.

== Career ==
=== Indian Springs School ===
Woodard, an All-America player at Brockport State University, moved to Alabama to begin a soccer program at Indian Springs School. In those early days his Indian Springs team won prep championship after championship, first playing in the Dixie Conference that included teams from Tennessee and Georgia.

Indian Springs was a tiny school of about 150 students. It was the first high school in Alabama to field a boys' soccer team. When his teams started losing state titles, more often than not those losses came at the hands of coaches who had played for him at Indian Springs.

=== "Father of soccer in Alabama" ===
Over a span of four decades Ray Woodard introduced soccer to thousands of young players in Alabama.

Woodard was Alabama's first "A" licensed coach and was the state's first Director of Coaching, then strictly a volunteer position. He started the state licensing program and taught all of the courses until 1994. He was always a teacher of the game.

According to Dan Mikos, current President of Alabama Youth Soccer, :

I started coaching in 1981 and was totally lost. I had no soccer background and very minimal training from my club. Fortunately, in my second season I was given a practice area at Indian Springs School and met Ray Woodard. I soon learned he had started the first high school league, our state’s first referee organization, was our only "A" licensed coach, and our only ODP coach. Yet, each time I practiced my U-8 team he would come by and give us a new drill or coaching technique.

Kenneth White, former Director of Coaching for the Alabama Youth Soccer said, "Ray Woodard has always been the epitome of sportsmanship. His coaching has always been positive in its approach. He is never negative and rarely raised his voice or degraded a player. He set a standard of Fair player and sportsmanship to his players that was beyond reproach."

=== Paralysis ===
During his time coaching Alabama's girls Olympic Development Program team in 1997, Woodard was partially paralyzed by an aneurysm. With extensive rehab, he was able to attend regional camp in a golf cart to watch his team compete.

== Awards and honors ==
At a February 2002 ceremony in Atlanta, Ray Woodard was named the 2001 Youth National Coach of the Year for Boys by the United States Youth Soccer Association.

Among the many recommendations for Woodard's nomination as Coach of the Year, one of his former Indian Springs players, Dr. James Geyer said, "He (Woodard) has taken soccer from an almost unknown pastime in Alabama to a major sport. His interest was not only in developing his team, but also in developing the sport as a whole."

== See also ==
- List of people from Alabama
- Soccer in the United States
