= Lyman Woodard Furniture and Casket Company Building =

- U.S. National Register of Historic Places
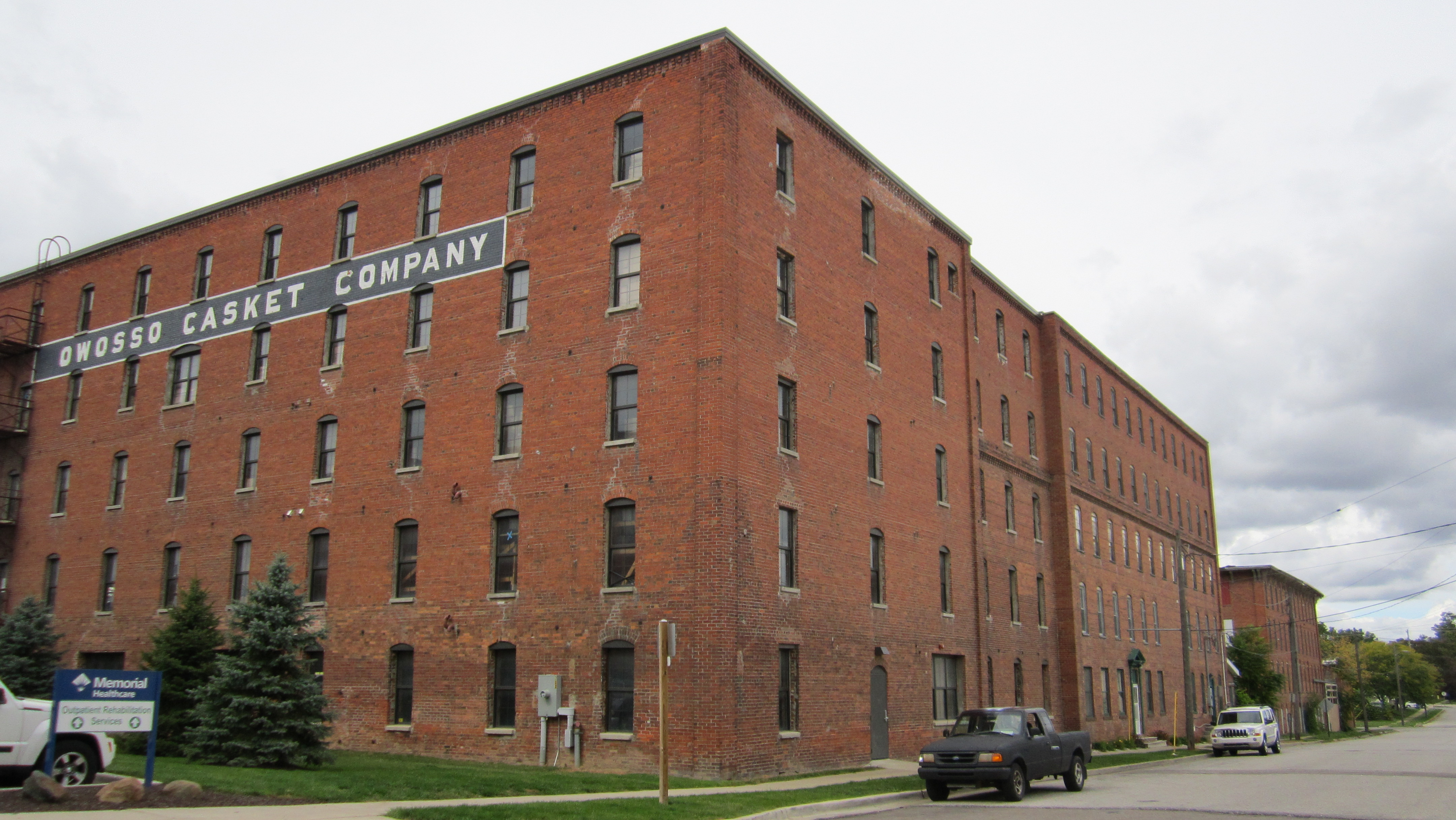
- Factory building, showing 1885 and 1888 construction
- Interactive map
- Location: 216-222 Elm St., Owosso, Michigan
- Coordinates: 42°59′44″N 84°10′43″W
- Area: 2 acres (0.81 ha)
- Built: 1885
- Architectural style: Italianate
- MPS: Owosso MRA
- NRHP reference No.: 80001915
- Added to NRHP: November 4, 1980

The Lyman Woodard Furniture and Casket Company Building is a former factory building located at 219-222 South Elm Street in Owosso, Michigan. It was listed on the National Register of Historic Places in 1980.

== History ==
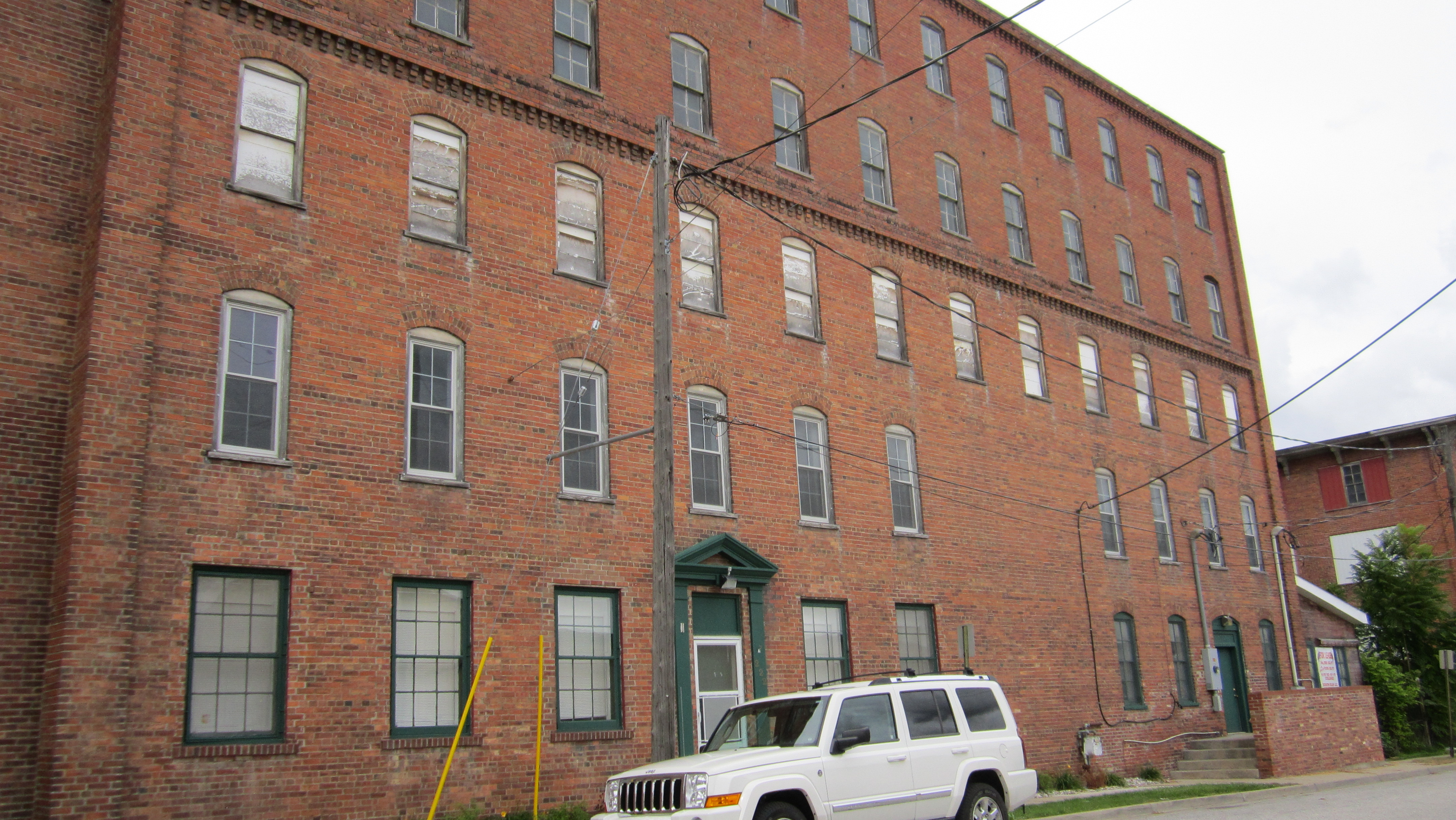
Closeup of entrance

Lyman E. Woodard was an architect and builder from New York. In 1866, he moved to Owosso and opened a wood sash, blind, and door manufacturing company, the first of many woodworking companies to establish themselves in Owosso. Through the 1870s and 1880s, Woodard grew his business to include furniture and caskets in addition to sash, blinds, and doors. He also undertook an aggressive advertising campaign that was to make his products known throughout the United States. To increase his clientele, Woodard diversified his product line to produce similar item in varying quality and price, so that a consumer could purchase a simple pine bedstead, or an elaborately carved ash or walnut unit. In 1885, Woodard's Furniture and Casket Company had grown large enough that he constructed a new facility to house it at the corner of Cass and South Elm Streets. In 1888, a large section of the new factory complex burned, but was rebuilt by Woodard later the same year.

Lyman Woodard died in 1904, and the business passed to his sons Frank, Fred, and Lee Woodard. They dropped the sash and door products to concentrate on furniture and caskets. By the 1910s, the flu epidemic created a booming casket business, and by the 1920s the Owosso Casket Company was the world's largest casket maker. However, the Great Depression took its toll on the businesses, and by 1942 both the Woodard Casket Company and Furniture Company had liquidated assets, with Lee Woodard starting a new line of metal furniture. The Woodard Furniture Company remained nearby until 1995, when moved its factory and offices into a new building. As of 2015, the former Casket Company Building remained substantially vacant.

== Description ==
The Lyman Woodard Furniture and Casket Company Building is a large Commercial Italianate brick factory building, containing several connecting production areas, ranging from two to five stories high. The factory has simple four-over-four double hung sash windows in bowed arch openings. The brickwork features brick bandcourses and pilasters, and a trabeated brick corniceline.
