= Mike Woodard (baseball) =

American baseball player (born 1960)

- Second baseman
- Born: March 2, 1960 (age 65); Melrose Park, Illinois, U.S.
- Batted: Left Threw: Right

MLB debut
- September 11, 1985, for the San Francisco Giants

Last MLB appearance
- July 10, 1988, for the Chicago White Sox

MLB statistics
- Batting average: .222
- Home runs: 1
- Runs batted in: 19
- Stats at Baseball Reference

Teams
- San Francisco Giants (1985–1987); Chicago White Sox (1988)

Michael Cary Woodard (born March 2, 1960) is an American former professional baseball player. He played all or part of four seasons in Major League Baseball (MLB), from 1985 through 1988, for the San Francisco Giants (1985–87) and Chicago White Sox (1988), primarily as a second baseman. He batted left-handed and threw right-handed.

In his major league career, Woodard had a batting average of .222, going 50-for-225, with one home run and 19 RBIs in 100 games, including 29 runs, four doubles, two triples, and 14 stolen bases.
