= Gary Rajsich =

American baseball player (born 1954)

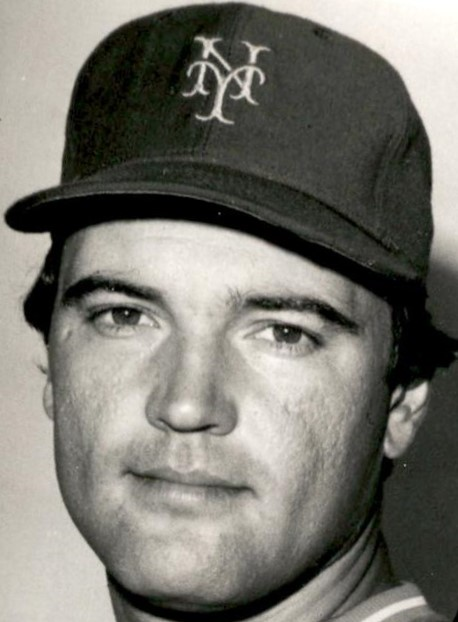
- Outfielder
- Born: October 28, 1954 (age 71); Youngstown, Ohio, U.S.
- Batted: Left Threw: Left

Professional debut
- MLB: April 9, 1982, for the New York Mets
- NPB: 1986, for the Chunichi Dragons

Last appearance
- MLB: July 1, 1985, for the San Francisco Giants
- NPB: 1988, for the Chunichi Dragons

MLB statistics
- Batting average: .236
- Home runs: 3
- Runs batted in: 27

NPB statistics
- Batting average: .283
- Home runs: 76
- Runs batted in: 189
- Stats at Baseball Reference

Teams
- New York Mets (1982–1983); St. Louis Cardinals (1984); San Francisco Giants (1985); Chunichi Dragons (1986–1988)

Gary Louis Rajsich (/ˈreɪsɪtʃ/ RAY-sitch; born October 28, 1954) is an American Major League Baseball (MLB) scout and a former professional baseball outfielder. He played all or parts of four seasons in the Majors from 1982 until 1985, then played three additional seasons for the Chunichi Dragons from 1986 until 1988. He was the Baltimore Orioles' director of amateur scouting from November 28, 2011, until the conclusion of the 2018 season.

Gary is the brother of former Major League pitcher Dave Rajsich, with whom he played for the St. Petersburg Pelicans of the Senior Professional Baseball Association in 1989. He also has scouted for the Boston Red Sox (1994–2006), Texas Rangers (2007–2009), Toronto Blue Jays (2010–2011) & Atlanta Braves (2019–Present).
