= National Register of Historic Places listings in Craven County, North Carolina =

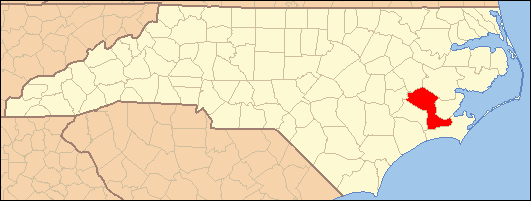

This list includes properties and districts listed on the National Register of Historic Places in Craven County, North Carolina. Click the "Map of all coordinates" link to the right to view an online map of all properties and districts with latitude and longitude coordinates in the table below.

== Current listings ==
This National Park Service list is complete through NPS recent listings posted February 20, 2026.

| | Name on the Register | Image | Date listed | Location | City or town | Description |
|---|---|---|---|---|---|---|
| 1 | Attmore-Oliver House | Attmore-Oliver House | January 20, 1972 (#72000932) | 513 Broad St. 35°06′30″N 77°02′31″W | New Bern | |
| 2 | J.T. Barber School | J.T. Barber School | December 20, 2006 (#06001139) | 1700 Cobb St. 35°07′04″N 77°03′54″W | New Bern | |
| 3 | Baxter Clock | Baxter Clock | July 2, 1973 (#73001319) | 323 Pollock St. 35°06′23″N 77°02′22″W | New Bern | |
| 4 | Bellair | Bellair | August 25, 1972 (#72000933) | West of New Bern off SR 1401; 35°10′50″N 77°07′19″W | New Bern | |
| 5 | Blades House | Blades House | January 14, 1972 (#72000934) | 602 Middle St. 35°06′40″N 77°02′21″W | New Bern | |
| 6 | Bryan House and Office | Bryan House and Office | March 24, 1972 (#72000935) | 603-605 Pollock St. 35°06′24″N 77°02′38″W | New Bern | |
| 7 | Cedar Grove Cemetery | Cedar Grove Cemetery | December 5, 1972 (#72000936) | Bounded by Queen, George, Cypress, Howard, and Metcalf Sts. 35°06′53″N 77°02′41″W | New Bern | |
| 8 | Cedar Street Recreation Center | Cedar Street Recreation Center | August 21, 2003 (#03000802) | 822 Cedar St. 35°06′44″N 77°02′47″W | New Bern | |
| 9 | Centenary Methodist Church | Centenary Methodist Church | September 11, 1972 (#72000937) | 209 New St. 35°06′33″N 77°02′21″W | New Bern | |
| 10 | Central Elementary School | Central Elementary School | January 20, 1972 (#72000938) | 311-313 New St. and 517 Hancock St. 35°06′37″N 77°02′29″W | New Bern | |
| 11 | Christ Episcopal Church and Parish House | Christ Episcopal Church and Parish House | April 13, 1973 (#73001320) | 320 Pollock St. 35°06′26″N 77°02′21″W | New Bern | |
| 12 | Clear Springs Plantation | Clear Springs Plantation | March 14, 1973 (#73001318) | N of Jasper; 35°12′57″N 77°12′03″W | Jasper | |
| 13 | Clubfoot and Harlow Canal | | February 23, 2026 (#100012435) | 328 yards (300 m) east of State Route 101; 34°50′28″N 76°45′09″W | Harlowe vicinity | |
| 14 | Coor-Bishop House | Coor-Bishop House | November 9, 1972 (#72000939) | 501 E. Front St. 35°06′33″N 77°02′10″W | New Bern | |
| 15 | Coor-Gaston House | Coor-Gaston House | February 1, 1972 (#72000940) | 421 Craven St. 35°06′32″N 77°02′18″W | New Bern | |
| 16 | Craven Terrace | Craven Terrace | August 19, 2014 (#14000517) | 601 Roundtree St. 35°06′34″N 77°02′57″W | New Bern | |
| 17 | DeGraffenried Park Historic District | DeGraffenried Park Historic District | August 9, 2006 (#06000689) | Roughly bounded by Neuse Boulevard, Fort Totten Dr., Trent Rd., and Chattawka Ln. 35°06′27″N 77°03′38″W | New Bern | |
| 18 | Ebenezer Presbyterian Church | Ebenezer Presbyterian Church | June 30, 1997 (#97000573) | 720 Bern St. 35°06′42″N 77°02′46″W | New Bern | |
| 19 | First Baptist Church | First Baptist Church | March 24, 1972 (#72000941) | Middle St. and Church Alley; 35°06′23″N 77°02′25″W | New Bern | |
| 20 | First Church of Christ, Scientist | First Church of Christ, Scientist | October 2, 1973 (#73001321) | 406 and 408 Middle St. 35°06′31″N 77°02′22″W | New Bern | |
| 21 | First Missionary Baptist Church | First Missionary Baptist Church | June 30, 1997 (#97000574) | 819 Cypress St. 35°06′51″N 77°02′51″W | New Bern | |
| 22 | First Presbyterian Church and Churchyard | First Presbyterian Church and Churchyard | February 1, 1972 (#72000942) | New St. between Middle and Hancock Sts. 35°06′36″N 77°02′25″W | New Bern | |
| 23 | Ghent Historic District | Ghent Historic District | March 17, 1988 (#88000226) | Roughly bounded by Trent Blvd., First St., Park Ave., and Seventh St. 35°06′18″N 77°03′45″W | New Bern | |
| 24 | Gull Harbor | Gull Harbor | August 14, 1973 (#73001322) | 514 E. Front St. 35°06′37″N 77°02′08″W | New Bern | |
| 25 | Harvey Mansion | Harvey Mansion | November 12, 1971 (#71000574) | 219 Tryon Palace Dr. 35°06′16″N 77°02′17″W | New Bern | |
| 26 | Hawks House | Hawks House | March 16, 1972 (#72000943) | 306 Hancock St. 35°06′27″N 77°02′29″W | New Bern | According to a contact at the New Bern Historical Society, this house was moved in the 1970s to 517 New Street. The property at 306 Hancock St. is vacant. |
| 27 | William Hollister House | William Hollister House | June 30, 1972 (#72000944) | 613 Broad St. 35°06′33″N 77°02′40″W | New Bern | |
| 28 | Thomas Jerkins House | Thomas Jerkins House | October 18, 1972 (#72000945) | 305 Johnson St. 35°06′38″N 77°02′17″W | New Bern | |
| 29 | Jerkins-Duffy House | Jerkins-Duffy House | March 17, 1988 (#88000232) | 301 Johnston St. 35°06′37″N 77°02′18″W | New Bern | |
| 30 | Jones-Jarvis House | Jones-Jarvis House | April 11, 1973 (#73001323) | 528 E. Front St. 35°06′40″N 77°02′11″W | New Bern | |
| 31 | Ulysses S. Mace House | Ulysses S. Mace House | June 4, 1973 (#73001324) | 518 Broad St. 35°06′31″N 77°02′34″W | New Bern | |
| 32 | Masonic Temple and Theater | Masonic Temple and Theater | March 16, 1972 (#72000946) | 516 Hancock St. 35°06′39″N 77°02′26″W | New Bern | |
| 33 | Mount Shiloh Missionary Baptist Church | Mount Shiloh Missionary Baptist Church | March 1, 2007 (#07000093) | 307 Scott St. 35°04′48″N 77°02′18″W | New Bern | |
| 34 | New Bern Battlefield Site | New Bern Battlefield Site | October 19, 2001 (#01001129) | US 70 E., approx. 4.5 miles SE of New Bern; 35°02′39″N 77°00′56″W | New Bern | |
| 35 | New Bern Historic District | New Bern Historic District | June 19, 1973 (#73001325) | Roughly bounded by Neuse and Trent Rivers and Queen St.; also roughly 2 blocks of N. Craven, 1 block of Pasteur St., and roughly along Bern, West, and Cedar Sts. and Trent Court; also bounded by Roundtree, Oak, W. F, W. A, N. Bern, Bern, Nunn & Cedar Sts. 35°06′56″N 77°02′58″W | New Bern | Second and third sets of boundaries represents boundary increases of September 25, 2003 and January 5, 2016. |
| 36 | New Bern Municipal Building | New Bern Municipal Building | June 4, 1973 (#73001326) | Pollock and Craven Sts. 35°06′25″N 77°02′18″W | New Bern | |
| 37 | New Bern National Cemetery | New Bern National Cemetery | January 31, 1997 (#97000023) | 1711 National Ave. 35°07′25″N 77°03′12″W | New Bern | |
| 38 | Rhem-Waldrop House | Rhem-Waldrop House | October 18, 1972 (#72000947) | 701 Broad St. 35°06′29″N 77°02′43″W | New Bern | |
| 39 | Riverside Historic District | Riverside Historic District | February 9, 1988 (#87002579) | Roughly bounded by N. Craven St., North Ave., E St., and Guion St. 35°07′09″N 77°02′51″W | New Bern | |
| 40 | Rue Chapel AME Church | Rue Chapel AME Church | June 30, 1997 (#97000572) | 709 Oak St. 35°06′39″N 77°03′00″W | New Bern | |
| 41 | Dr. Earl S. Sloan House | Dr. Earl S. Sloan House | August 14, 1986 (#86001627) | 3701 Country Club Rd. 35°04′54″N 77°04′58″W | Trent Woods | |
| 42 | Slover-Bradham House | Slover-Bradham House | April 11, 1973 (#73001327) | 201 Johnson St. 35°06′39″N 77°02′13″W | New Bern | |
| 43 | Eli Smallwood House | Eli Smallwood House | December 5, 1972 (#72000948) | 524 E. Front St. 35°06′39″N 77°02′11″W | New Bern | |
| 44 | Isaac H. Smith Jr. House | Isaac H. Smith Jr. House | September 14, 2002 (#02000965) | 605 Johnson St. 35°06′37″N 77°02′37″W | New Bern | |
| 45 | Benjamin Smith House | Benjamin Smith House | April 13, 1972 (#72000949) | 210 Hancock St. 35°06′21″N 77°02′30″W | New Bern | |
| 46 | Smith-Whitford House | Smith-Whitford House | April 13, 1972 (#72000950) | 506 Craven St. 35°06′36″N 77°02′16″W | New Bern | |
| 47 | St. John's Missionary Baptist Church | St. John's Missionary Baptist Church | June 30, 1997 (#97000575) | 1130 Walt Bellamy Dr. 35°06′16″N 77°03′12″W | New Bern | |
| 48 | St. Paul's Roman Catholic Church | St. Paul's Roman Catholic Church | March 24, 1972 (#72000951) | 510 Middle St. 35°06′35″N 77°02′22″W | New Bern | |
| 49 | St. Peter's AME Zion Church | St. Peter's AME Zion Church | June 30, 1997 (#97000571) | 615 Queen St. 35°06′37″N 77°02′37″W | New Bern | |
| 50 | Edward R. Stanly House | Edward R. Stanly House | March 24, 1972 (#72000952) | 502 Pollock St. 35°06′31″N 77°02′31″W | New Bern | |
| 51 | John Wright Stanly House | John Wright Stanly House | February 26, 1970 (#70000450) | 307 George St. 35°06′26″N 77°02′41″W | New Bern | |
| 52 | Stevenson House | Stevenson House | August 26, 1971 (#71000575) | 609-611 Pollock St. 35°06′24″N 77°02′38″W | New Bern | |
| 53 | Isaac Taylor House | Isaac Taylor House | December 27, 1972 (#72000953) | 228 Craven St. 35°06′19″N 77°02′18″W | New Bern | |
| 54 | Tisdale-Jones House | Tisdale-Jones House | April 25, 1972 (#72000954) | 520 New St. 35°06′36″N 77°02′33″W | New Bern | |
| 55 | U.S. Post Office, Court House, and Custom House | U.S. Post Office, Court House, and Custom House | August 7, 2018 (#100002775) | 413 Middle St. 35°06′33″N 77°02′23″W | New Bern | |
| 56 | York-Gordon House | York-Gordon House | June 18, 1973 (#73001328) | 213 Hancock St. 35°06′21″N 77°02′31″W | New Bern | |

== Former listing ==
| | Name on the Register | Image | Date listed | Date removed | Location | City or town | Description |
|---|---|---|---|---|---|---|---|
| 1 | Simpson-Oaksmith-Patterson House | Simpson-Oaksmith-Patterson House | January 20, 1972 (#72001538) | October 23, 1974 | 226 E. Front St. | New Bern | |

== See also ==
- National Register of Historic Places listings in North Carolina
- List of National Historic Landmarks in North Carolina
