= Jerkins =

Jerkins is a surname. Notable people with the surname include:

- Fred Jerkins III, American songwriter and record producer
- Morgan Jerkins (born 1992), American writer and editor
- Rodney Jerkins (born 1977), American record producer, rapper, and songwriter

== See also ==
- Thomas Jerkins House
- Jerkins-Duffy House
