= First Missionary Baptist Church =

First Missionary Baptist Church may refer to:

- First Missionary Baptist Church (Little Rock, Arkansas), listed on the NRHP in Arkansas
- First Missionary Baptist Church (New Bern, North Carolina), listed on the NRHP in North Carolina
