= Gull Harbor =

Gull Harbor may refer to:

- Gull Harbor (New Bern, North Carolina), a historic house
- Gull Harbor (Washington), a bay
