= Cedar Street =

Cedar Street is a common street name. It may refer to:

- Cedar Street Bridge, in Illinois, United States
- Cedar Street Recreation Center, New Bern, North Carolina
- Cedar Street station, bus station in Newington, Connecticut
- Cedar Street subway, rail tunnel in Newark, New Jersey
- Cedar Street Times, newspaper in Pacific Grove, California.
- Cedar Tavern (also called Cedar Street Tavern), Greenwich Village, New York City
- 130 Cedar Street, building in Manhattan, New York City
- Cedar Street, a tower block housing complex in Woodside, Glasgow, Scotland
