= Jones–Jarvis House =

Historic house in North Carolina, United States

- U.S. National Register of Historic Places
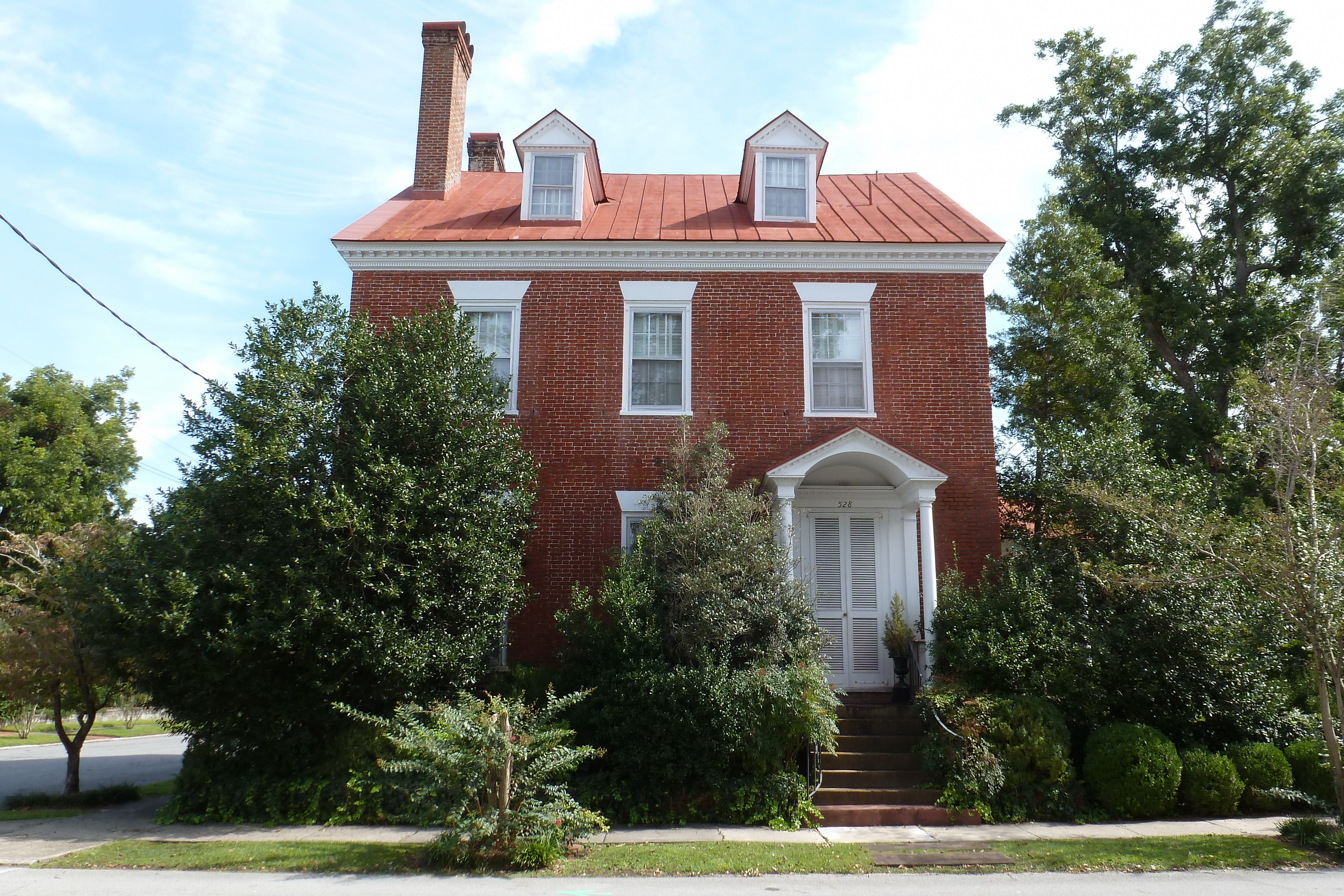
- Jones–Jarvis House, September 2012

- Location within North Carolina Location within the United States
- Location: 528 E. Front St., New Bern, North Carolina
- Coordinates: 35°6′40″N 77°2′11″W
- Area: 0.5 acres (0.20 ha)
- Built: c. 1810
- Built by: Dewey, John
- Architectural style: Federal
- NRHP reference No.: 73001323
- Added to NRHP: April 11, 1973

Jones–Jarvis House, also known as General Foster's Headquarters and Jarvis–Slover House, is a historic home located at New Bern, Craven County, North Carolina. It was built about 1810, and is a 2 1/2-story, three-bay, side-hall plan, Federal-style brick dwelling. It has a one-story brick and frame rear wing. During the American Civil War, General John G. Foster moved into this house, and it served first as his residence and later as part of the headquarters of the Eighteenth Army Corps.

It was listed on the National Register of Historic Places in 1973.

== Architecture ==
The Jones–Jarvis House is one of New Bern's outstanding examples of federal architecture. The lot was purchased by Frederick Jones in 1810 for $1,575 and later sold to Moses Jarvis. It was occupied and listed on tax records in 1816. The National Register of Historic Places describes it as:

"one of a small number of brick Federal houses in New Bern, all built on a side-hall plan, and all similar. Either because of site, or finish, or the occupations of their owners, however, each possesses a distinct architectural and historical character. This house, with its lots fronting on the Neuse River, is part of a group of nineteenth century brick houses at the corner of Union and East Front streets which is one of the finest architectural complexes in the state."

The brickwork is laid in Flemish bond.

The Eli Smallwood House next door and the Jones-Jarvis house are nearly identical. Across the street is the Slover–Bradham House. It was the Union Army General Burnside's headquarters, whose "distinctive style of facial hair became known as sideburns, derived from his last name." The house later became that of Caleb Bradham, a pharmacist who invented Pepsi-Cola in 1898.

== Timeline ==
- 1810 Lot purchased by Frederic Jones for $1,575
- 1811 Purchased by Moses Jarvis
- 1816 House occupied and listed in tax records
- 1817 Transferred to Sylvester Brown
- 1822 Returned to Moses Jarvis, Jr.
- 1858 Purchased by Alonzo T. Jerkins
- 1862 – 1865 Occupied by Union Army as part of headquarters. Became private residence for General John Foster.
- 1868 Purchased by Mary C. Slover

== Related names ==
Jarvis–Slover House, Jones–Jarvis–Hand House, Jones–Jarvis House, General Foster's Headquarters, Tryon Palace
