= United States Post Office and Courthouse (New Bern, North Carolina) =

Historic building in the United States

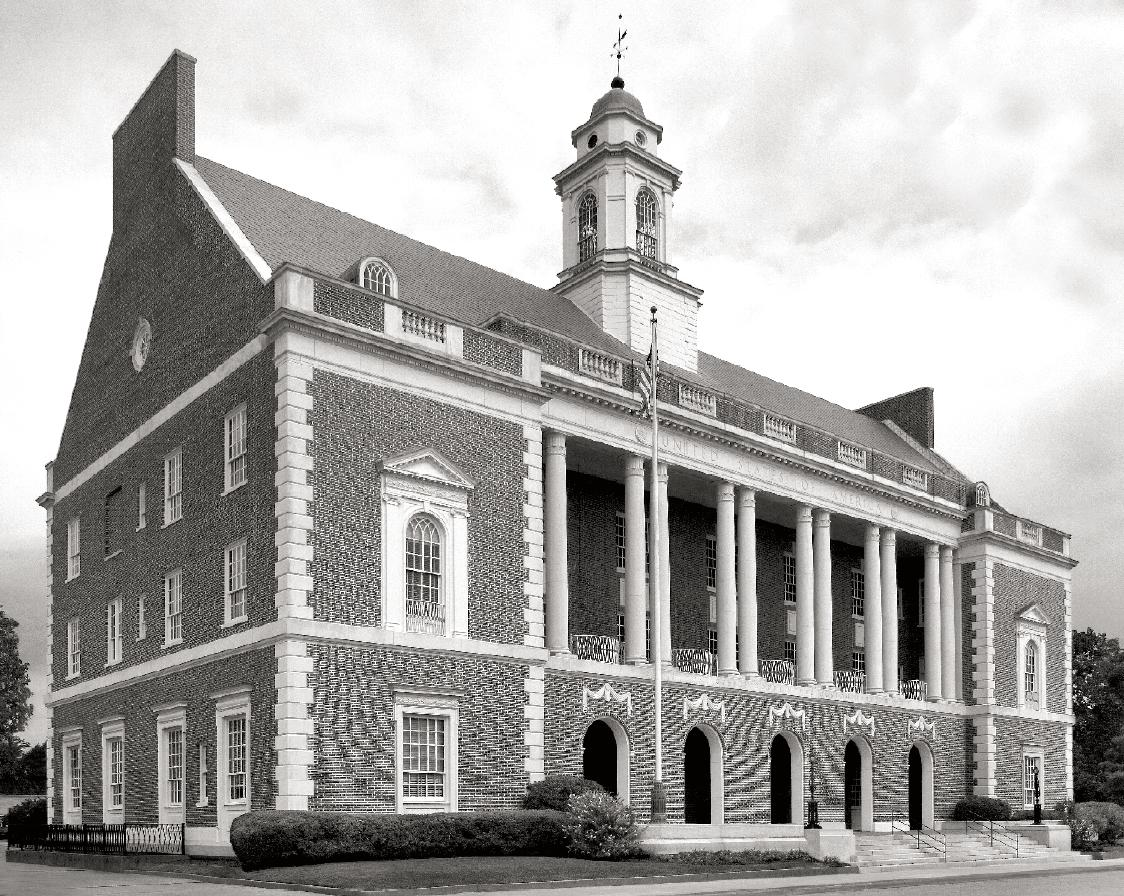

The United States Post Office and Courthouse is a courthouse of the United States District Court for the Eastern District of North Carolina, located in New Bern, North Carolina. The building was completed in 1935, and was listed in the National Register of Historic Places in 1973, as a contributing building within the New Bern Historic District, and was individually listed in 2018.

== Building history ==
As the town of New Bern grew into a busy port and commercial hub, the need for federal services increased. In 1897, the government constructed a Romanesque Revival building at the corner of Pollock and Craven streets to house a post office and courthouse. By the 1930s, however, the city required a larger facility, and officials chose not to expand the 1897 structure, the U.S. Department of the Treasury chose a site bounded by Middle, Broad, Hancock, and New streets. Controversy arose when business owners objected to the new location, and the Daughters of the American Revolution passed a resolution opposing the destruction of the John Wright Stanly House, an 18th-century Georgian building on the proposed lot. Officials proceeded with the project after the City of New Bern agreed to purchase the 1897 building for its city hall, and the Stanly House was relocated.

Construction of the U.S. Post Office and Courthouse began in 1933. Local architect Robert F. Smallwood designed the building, which opened on April 1, 1935, and cost $325,000 to build. At the time of its completion, it was one of the largest and most expensive buildings in the Eastern Carolina region. For a brief time, the new building also served as a custom house. During World War II, the United States Marine Corps Command Contingent occupied the second and third floors.

For much of its existence, matters addressed in the court were brought before John Davis Larkins, Jr., who was nominated to the U.S. District Court for the Eastern District of North Carolina by President John F. Kennedy in 1961 and who served there until his death in 1990. There, Larkins tried several important cases, which greatly strengthened both civil rights and environmental protection legislation.

In 1973, it was listed in the National Register of Historic Places as a contributing building within the nationally significant New Bern Historic District. In 1992, the post office vacated the building but retained ownership. In 2004, the U.S. General Services Administration assumed ownership and initiated a renovation.

== Architecture ==
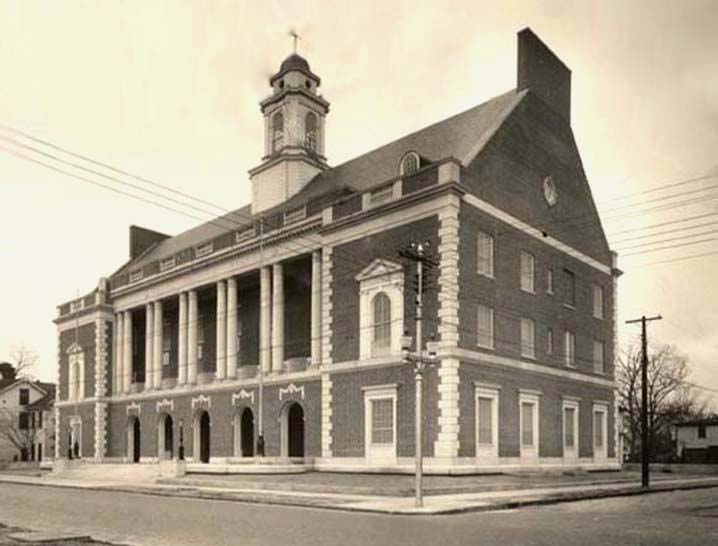
The New Bern Post Office and Courthouse in 1935.

The building is an example of the Georgian Revival style of architecture. This style is heavily influenced by colonial-era precedents and employs classical ornamentation. The building is three stories and sits atop a granite base. It is clad in red brick veneer that is laid in a common bond pattern. Contrasting limestone trim accentuates the exterior.

A central colonnade with six pairs of two-story limestone columns dominates the symmetrical facade. The first level contains five arched entrance openings topped by decorative swag-and-garland motifs executed in limestone. The classically designed entrances have broken pediments surmounted by cast-bronze eagles. A limestone water table encircles the building between the first and second levels. Projecting pavilions articulated by limestone quoins flank the colonnade. Arched windows with classical surrounds span the second and third floors. Classical pilasters support pediments. The same round-arch motif is repeated on two small copper-clad dormers. Double-hung, wood windows are found throughout the building. A parapet with balustrades tops the facade above a dentilled cornice. The steeply pitched roof is covered in slate. A prominent wood cupola with arched windows is capped with a copper roof.

The postal lobby spans the width of the building on the east side on the first floor. The east wall of the lobby contains fluted Royal black and white marble pilasters topped with plaster Ionic capitals. Alabama Creme and black marble tiles set on a diagonal cover the floor. The coved plaster ceiling features massive bronze octagonal light fixtures. The west wall of the lobby contains bays that formerly housed post-office boxes and service windows. The upper portions of the bays are filled with iron grilles with painted floral designs. Other remnants from the post office era include wall-mounted postal tables with black marble tops that extend from the eastern wall and are supported by scrolled brackets. Original directory boards are contained in classical frames topped by broken pediments and urn ornaments. Located at each end of the lobby, steel-frame marble staircases have ornamental iron balusters and aluminum handrails with large scrolled brackets.

The most significant interior space is the ceremonial courtroom located on the second floor. The walls are clad in mahogany panels punctuated by fluted pilasters with Ionic capitals. Behind the judge's bench is an arched opening surmounted by a broken pediment with a carved eagle. A dentilled cornice encircles the tops of the walls. The courtroom contains bronze chandeliers with eagle motifs that were meticulously designed by the building's architect Robert F. Smallwood.

The courtroom contains significant murals from the New Deal era. In 1938, David J. Silvette of Richmond, Virginia, painted three oil-on-canvas murals behind the judge's bench in the courtroom. The paintings were commissioned for a cost of $3,000 through the Section of Painting and Sculpture, U.S. Department of the Treasury. The murals illustrate significant events in New Bern's history and express the themes of justice, liberty, and freedom. The Bayard v. Singleton Case of 1787 established that the legislature's power is limited by the Constitution. The First Printing Press (1749) shows a representation of the earliest press in North Carolina and also illustrates Baron von Graffenried, the founder of New Bern, recruiting settlers to accompany him to the New World. Finally, First Provincial Convention in North Carolina (1774) depicts the first meeting of the local Congress in New Bern.

== Significant events ==
- 1710: New Bern founded
- 1765: New Bern established as colonial capital
- 1935: U.S. Post Office and Courthouse completed
- 1973: Listed in the National Register of Historic Places as a contributing building within the New Bern Historic District
- 1992: U.S. Post Office vacates building
- 2004: GSA assumes ownership of the building and initiates renovations

== Building facts ==
- Location: 413 Middle Street
- Architect: Robert F. Smallwood
- Construction Dates: 1933-1935
- Architectural Style: Georgian Revival
- Landmark Status: Contributing building within the National Register of Historic Places New Bern Historic District
- Primary Materials: Red brick veneer with limestone trim
- Prominent Features: Central colonnade with paired limestone columns; Cupola; Ceremonial courtroom with murals

== Attribution ==
- Material on this page was initially produced by the U.S. General Services Administration, an agency of the United States government, and is reproduced with the express permission of that agency. All works derived from this material must credit the U.S. General Services Administration. The original text produced by the General Services Administration is available here.
