= Baxter Clock =

Historic clock in North Carolina, US

- U.S. National Register of Historic Places
- U.S. Historic district – Contributing property
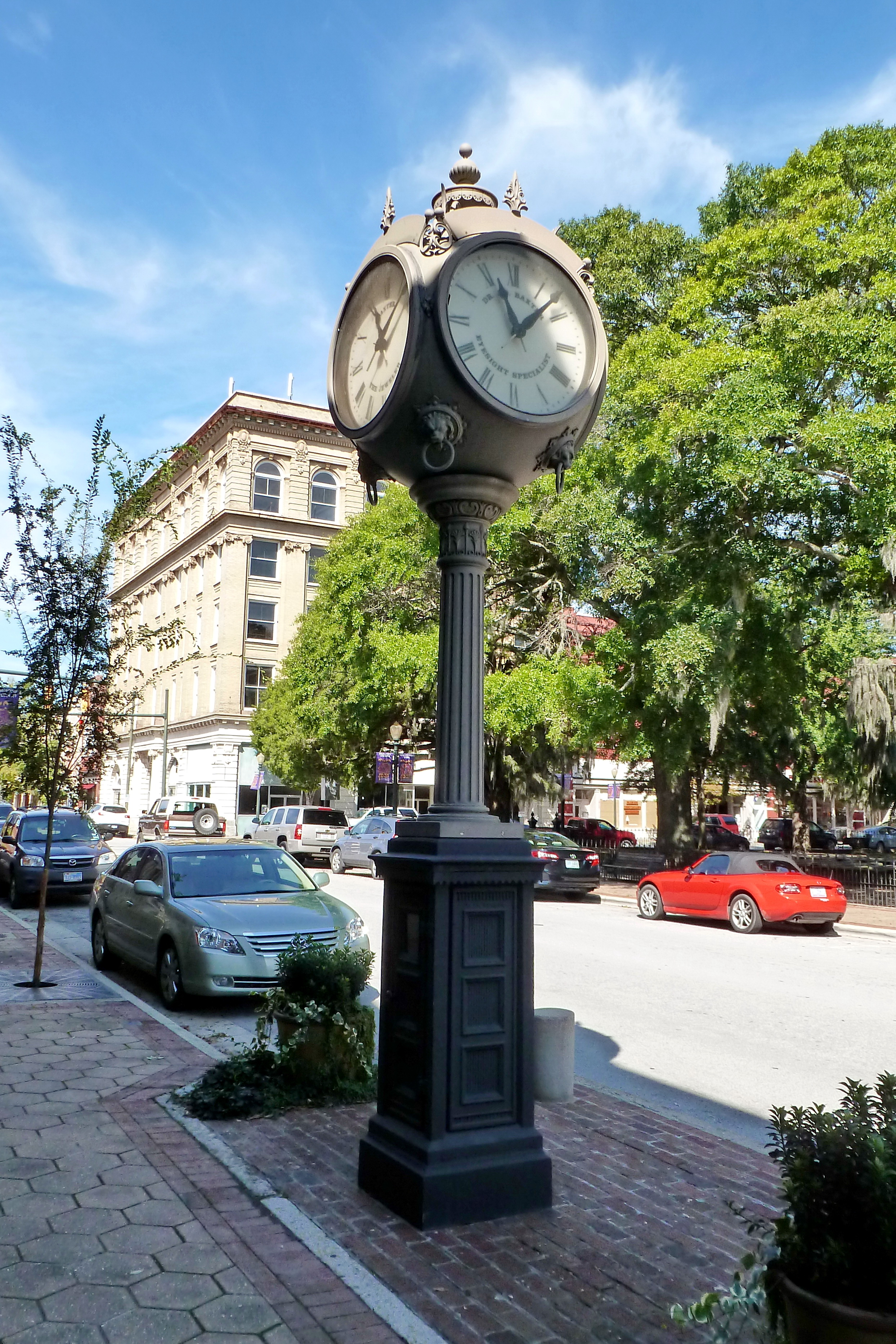
- Baxter Clock, September 2012

- Location within North Carolina Location within the United States
- Location: 323 Pollock Street; New Bern, North Carolina
- Coordinates: 35°6′23″N 77°2′22″W
- Area: less than one acre
- Built: 1920
- Built by: Seth Thomas Clock Company
- Part of: New Bern Historic District
- NRHP reference No.: 73001319
- Added to NRHP: July 2, 1973

Baxter Clock is a historic street clock located in New Bern, North Carolina. It was manufactured in 1920 by the Seth Thomas Clock Company, and erected in 1930 opposite the front entrance of Baxter's Jewelry Store. The four-sided clock has brass and steel works contained in a spherical cast iron case which consists of three stages. It was listed on the National Register of Historic Places (NRHP) in 1973, but in 1977, an accident resulted in the broken clock being placed in storage for almost fourteen years. The Baxter Clock is thought to be one of three operating clocks of its kind remaining in the country.

== History ==
Street clocks were installed in many American cities from the 1860s to the early 20th century, with the two largest manufacturers on the East Coast being the Seth Thomas Clock Company and the E. Howard Clock & Watch Company. The Baxter Clock stands in front of 323 Pollock Street, a Dutch Revival style property built in 1918 that was the longtime home of the Baxter's Jewelry Store. The building now houses Baxters 1892, a jazz club and bar. It was manufactured by the Seth Thomas Clock Company of Thomaston, Connecticut. The clock was built in 1920, but features a style and design similar to ones made in the late-19th century. Baxter's Jewelry Store, previously located on Middle Street, moved to Pollock Street around 1920, but didn't have the clock installed until 1930. It was listed on the NRHP on July 2, 1973. The clock was also designated a contributing property to the New Bern Historic District, which was listed on the NRHP on June 19, 1973.

On May 5, 1977, a furniture truck backed into the clock, damaging the pedestal. Benny and Della Baxter hired a salvage company the following day to use a crane to lift the clock from the pedestal so it could be repaired. During the procedure, the clock was accidentally dropped causing it to smash into pieces on the sidewalk. The cast iron casing of the clock was relatively unscathed, but much of the workings was heavily damaged. The accident shocked the Baxters and residents of New Bern. Dabney Coddington, then a curator at Tryon Palace, said "That block of Pollock Street really looks naked, believe me." The Baxters attempted to repair or replace the clock, but were unsuccessful. The surviving pedestal was all that remained on the street for the next fourteen years while the broken pieces were stored in the basement of the jewelry store. In 1990, the non-profit Swiss Bear Downtown Development Corporation wanted to see if it was possible to restore the clock. Swiss Bear was granted ownership of the clock by the Baxter family on the condition it was restored. Swiss Bear in turn told city leaders the organization would help restore the clock if the city took over ownership and maintenance costs following the restoration. A Swiss Bear representative contacted the clock manufacturer Verdin Company of Ohio which had the original patterns of the clock case. Swiss Bear began the Baxter Clock Restoration Campaign which raised the necessary $28,000 needed for repairs. The repaired clock was dedicated on April 20, 1991, with special guest Patricia Dorsey, Secretary of the North Carolina Department of Cultural Resources, in attendance. The clock is believed to be the only one of its kind remaining in North Carolina.

== Design ==
Baxter Clock is approximately 20 feet (6.1 m) tall and is illuminated at night. The clock is supported by a slim column on top of a tall pedestal while metal supports extending 10 feet (3.0 m) below the ground act as an anchor. The pedestal is painted black while the clock and column are brown. The pedestal features three vertical square panels, each covered with fluting, on all four sides. The top of each pedestal face includes the imprinting, "Seth Thomas," the clock manufacturer. Behind the panels on the north and south sides are doors with an iron knob allowing access to the clockwork. The clockwork inside the pedestal is an iron weight pulled down two iron rods by gravity. When this occurs, a steel and copper pendulum is swung, which in turn moves the hands of a small clock located behind the pendulum. The face of this clock is inscribed with the text "Seth Thomas, No. 2139, July 24, 1920". The interior clock regulates the four exterior faces of the clock.

The pedestal and column are separated by two stepped stages. The fluted column features a molded base and Corinthian style capital decorated with fern palmettes. The top of the clock was cast as four separate sections. There are visible seams on each corner of the clock as well as decorative lion heads surrounded by a palmette border. Each lion has an iron ring in its mouth. Each face of the clock measures 3 feet (0.91 m) in diameter and is protected by a glass cover. The time is indicated by hour, minute, and second hands made of iron, with black capital Roman numerals (hour), black squares (minutes), triangles (hour divisions), and diamonds (three hour intervals). The north and south faces feature black lettering reading "BAXTER THE JEWELER" while the east and west faces include the lettering "DR. J. O. BAXTER EYESIGHT SPECIALIST". The top portion of the clock includes Arabesque crockets above each face and a three-tiered finial. The finial is decorated with twisted fluting and leaf molding.

== See also ==
- National Register of Historic Places listings in Craven County, North Carolina
