= New Bern City Hall =

Historic municipal building in North Carolina

- New Bern Municipal Building
- U.S. National Register of Historic Places
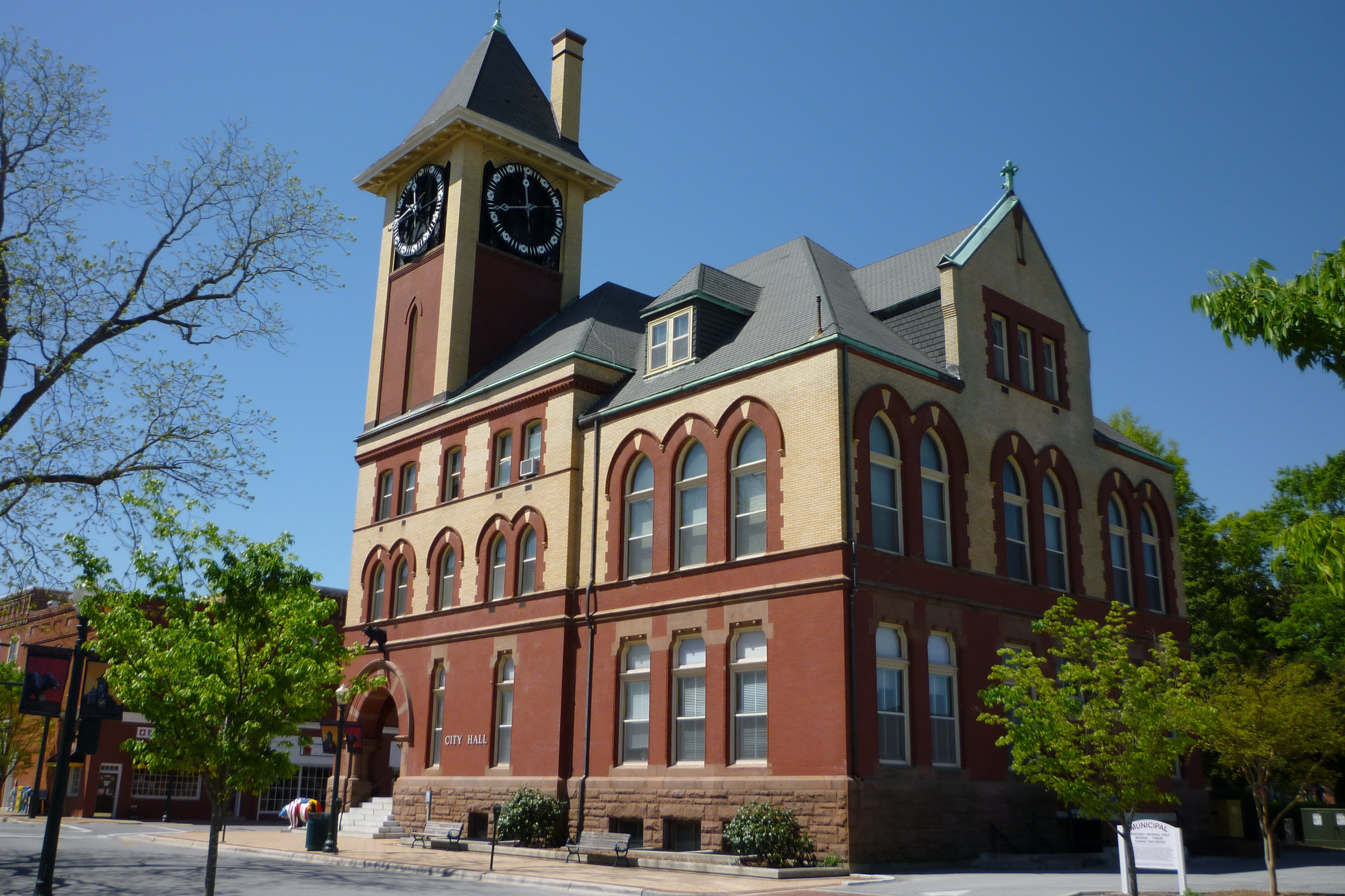
- New Bern Municipal Building, April 2010

- Location within North Carolina Location within the United States
- Location: 300 Pollock St., New Bern, North Carolina
- Coordinates: 35°6′25″N 77°2′19″W
- Area: 0.8 acres (0.32 ha)
- Built: 1897
- Architect: Charles E. Kemper, William Martin Aiken
- Architectural style: Romanesque
- NRHP reference No.: 73001326
- Added to NRHP: June 4, 1973

City Hall, also known as the Municipal Building, is a historic municipal building in New Bern, Craven County, North Carolina. It was originally built in 1897 by the federal government to house a post office, federal courthouse, and custom house. It is a 3 1/2-story, brick and granite building with a 2 1/2-story wing in the Romanesque Revival style. The building has hipped roofs with dormers. The Baxter Clock, a clock tower, is in the square outside. It became the municipal building in 1936.

It was listed on the National Register of Historic Places in 1973.
