= Rhem-Waldrop House =

Historic house in North Carolina, United States

- U.S. National Register of Historic Places
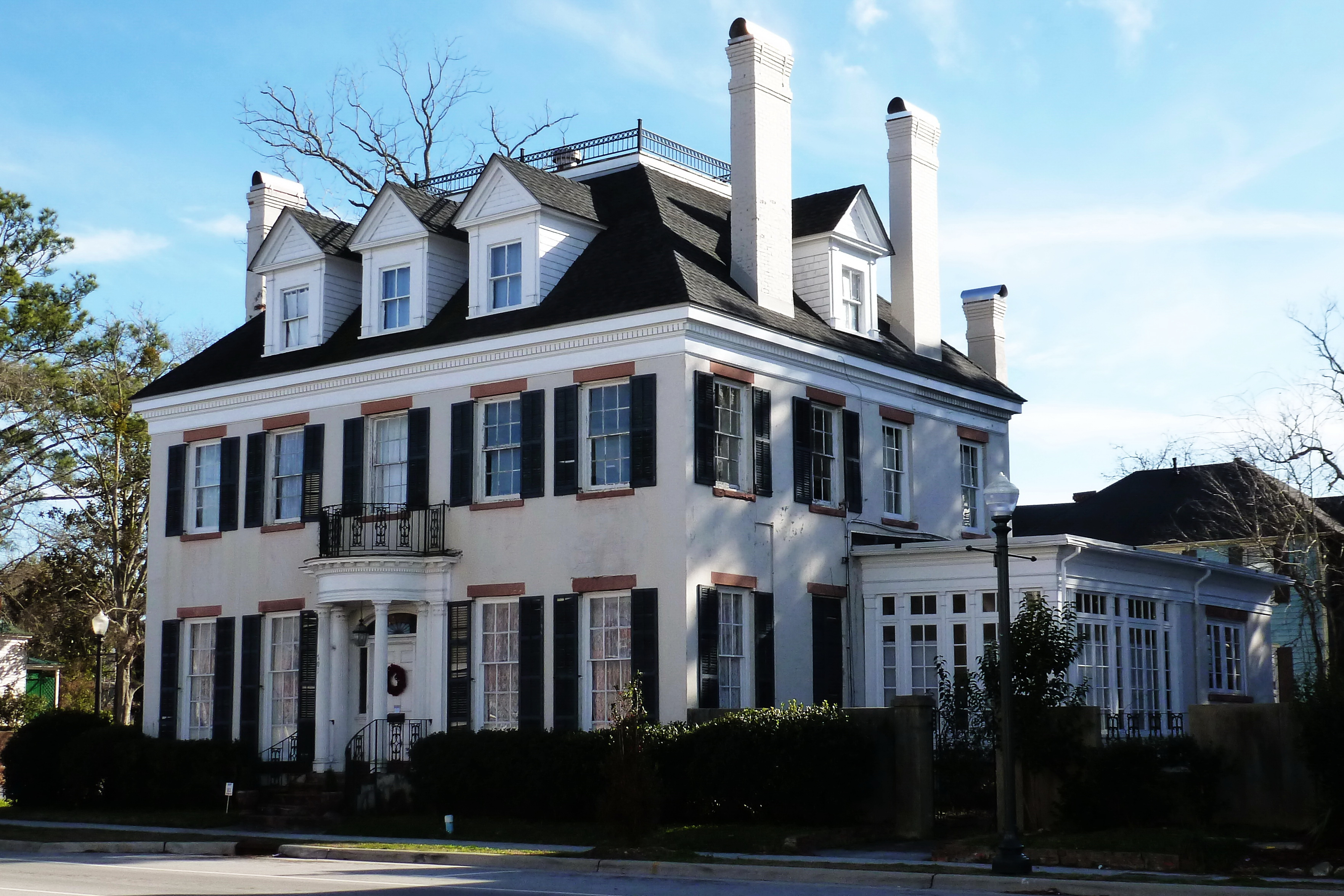
- Rhem-Waldrop House, September 2012

- Location within North Carolina Location within the United States
- Location: 701 Broad St., New Bern, North Carolina
- Coordinates: 35°6′29″N 77°2′43″W
- Area: 0.5 acres (0.20 ha)
- Built: c. 1855
- Architectural style: Renaissance
- NRHP reference No.: 72000947
- Added to NRHP: October 18, 1972

Rhem-Waldrop House, also known as the John L. Rhem House, is a historic home located at New Bern, Craven County, North Carolina. It was built about 1855, and is a 2 1/2-story, five bay by four bay, stuccoed brick dwelling in the Renaissance Revival style. It has a high deck-on-hip roof with dormers and a semicircular entrance porch with fluted columns.

It was listed on the National Register of Historic Places in 1972.
