= First Baptist Church (New Bern, North Carolina) =

Baptist Church in New Bern, North Carolina

- U.S. National Register of Historic Places
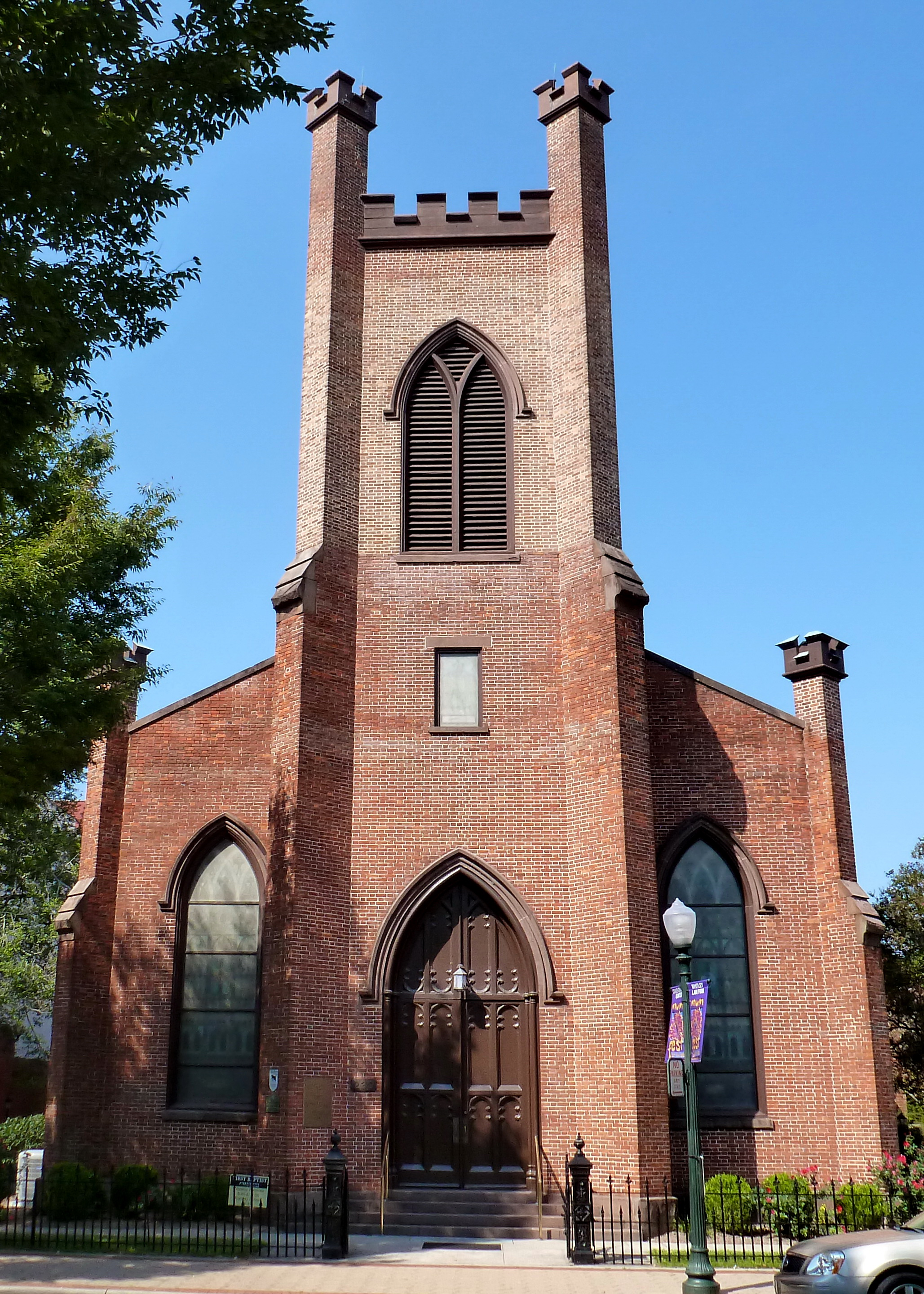

- Location within North Carolina Location within the United States
- Location: Middle St. and Church Alley, New Bern, North Carolina
- Coordinates: 35°6′11″N 77°2′45″W
- Area: less than one acre
- Built: 1848
- Architect: Thomas & Son
- Architectural style: Gothic Revival
- NRHP reference No.: 72000941
- Added to NRHP: March 24, 1972

First Baptist Church is a historic Baptist church affiliated with the Cooperative Baptist Fellowship located at Middle Street and Church Alley in New Bern, Craven County, North Carolina. It was built in 1848, and is a rectangular brick church building in the Gothic Revival style. It features a two-stage, turreted entrance tower. Its brickwork is laid in Flemish bond.

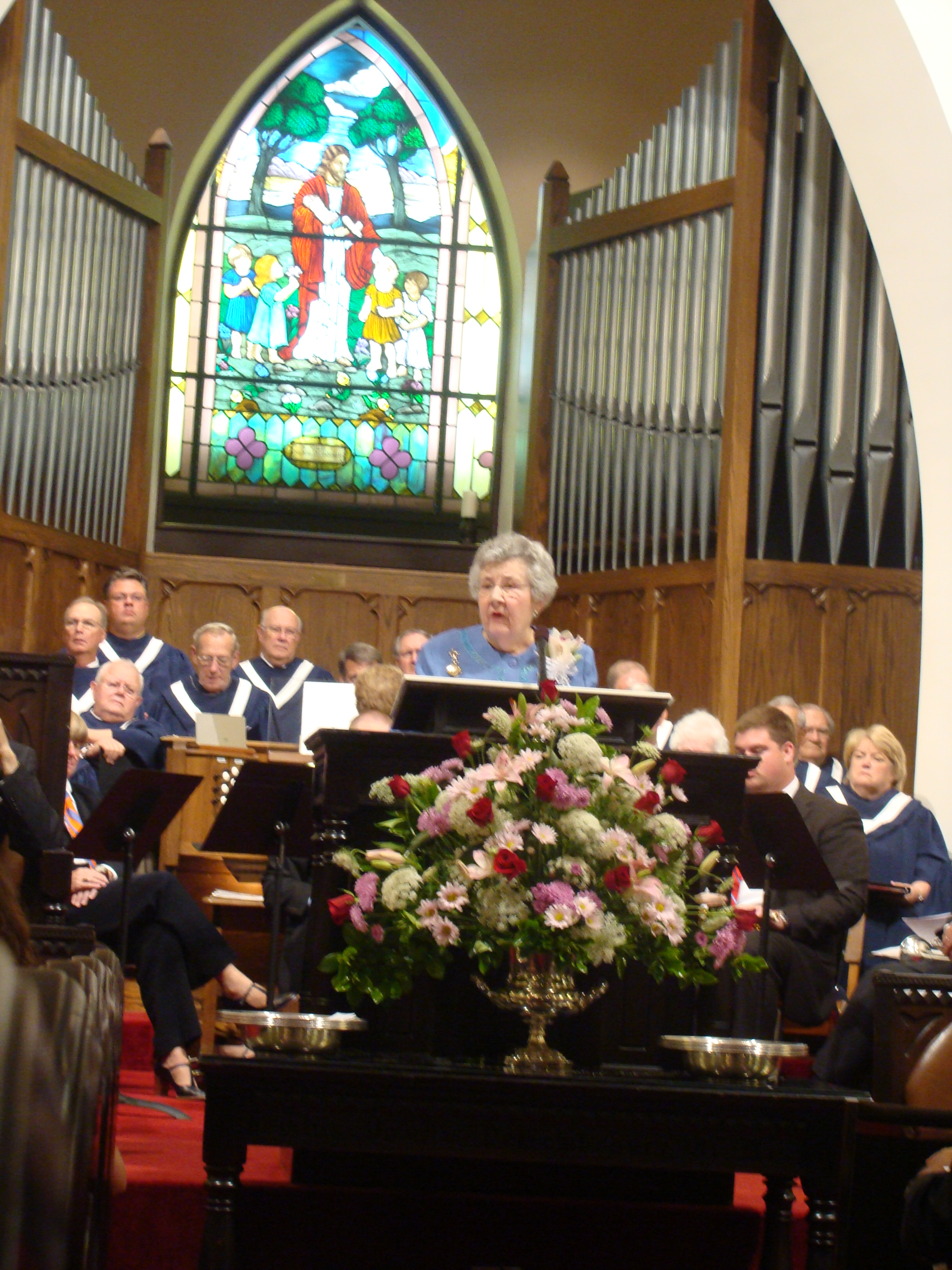

It was listed on the National Register of Historic Places in 1972.
