= Stevenson House (New Bern, North Carolina) =

Historic house in North Carolina, United States

- U.S. National Register of Historic Places
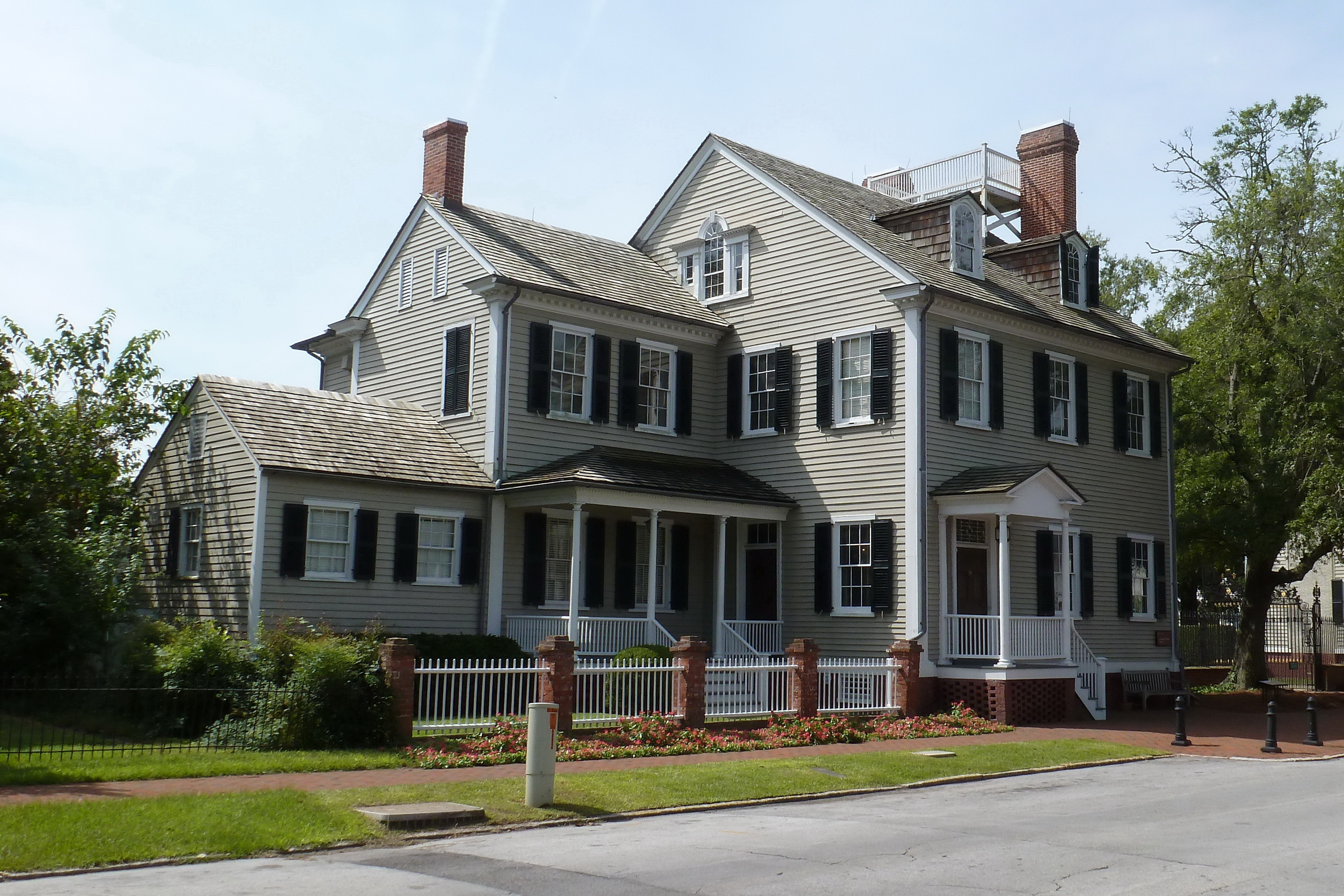
- Stevenson House, September 2012

- Location within North Carolina Location within the United States
- Location: 609-611 Pollock St., New Bern, North Carolina
- Coordinates: 35°6′24″N 77°2′38″W
- Area: 0.5 acres (0.20 ha)
- Built: c. 1805, 1890, 1957
- Architectural style: Federal, Federal vernacular
- NRHP reference No.: 71000575
- Added to NRHP: August 26, 1971

Stevenson House is a historic home located at New Bern, Craven County, North Carolina. It was built about 1805, and is a 2 1/2-story, three-bay, side hall plan Federal style frame dwelling. It has a two-story east wing added in 1890, and a one-story modern kitchen added in 1957.

It was listed on the National Register of Historic Places in 1971.
