= First Missionary Baptist Church (Little Rock, Arkansas) =

Historic church in Arkansas, United States

- U.S. National Register of Historic Places
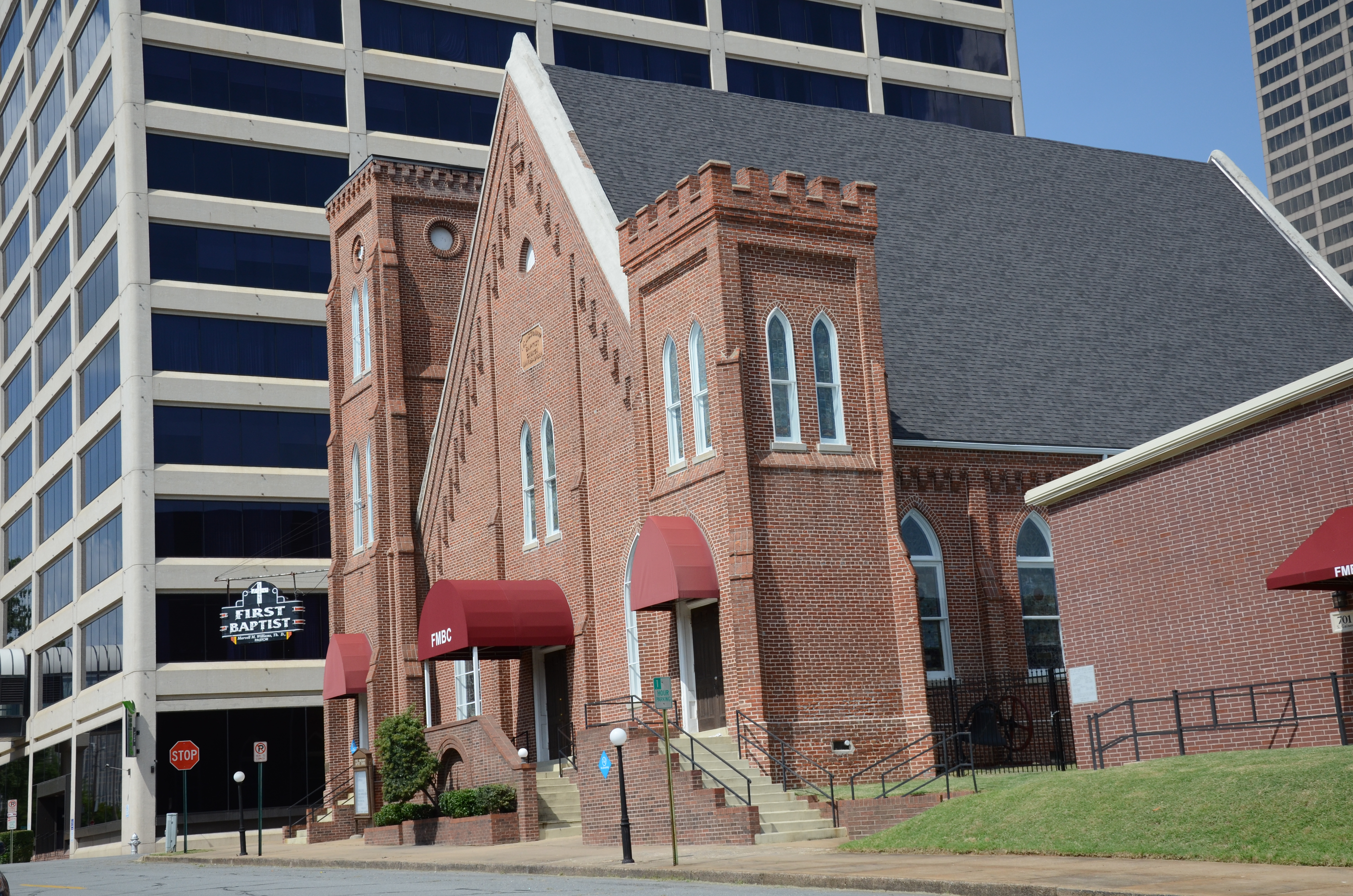

- Location within Arkansas Location within the United States
- Location: 701 S. Gaines St., Little Rock, Arkansas
- Coordinates: 34°44′35″N 92°16′41″W
- Built: 1882
- Architectural style: Gothic Revival
- NRHP reference No.: 83001164
- Added to NRHP: September 29, 1983

The First Missionary Baptist Church is a Gothic Revival style church located at 701 South Gaines Street in Little Rock, Arkansas. It was built in 1882, and added to the National Register of Historic Places in 1983. It is home to one of the oldest African-American congregations in the state, first organized in 1845.

== History ==
In the spring of 1845, a slave gathered enough courage to ask his master to allow him to form a church for the slaves to worship. This was a bold move, because slaves were thought of as chattel, and were bought and sold at will. The slave name was Rev. Wilson Brown.

Rev. Brown with the help of his master Major Fields, and a white Baptist minister, on the first Thursday night in April 1845, established the First Negro Baptist Church. Although they didn't have a building in which they could meet for services. So all gathered on May 2, 1847, and assemble what is called a brush arbor. The location was Tenth and Spring Street in Little Rock, Arkansas. God blessed the congregation to grow and gave them another miracle, a new building on the corner of Seventh and Gaines Street. This is still the site of the church today.

In April 1963, four months to the day of the famous "I have a dream" speech, Dr. Martin Luther King Jr. gave the 118th anniversary sermon. In 1990, only months before announcing his presidential aspirations, then-Governor Bill Clinton gave a rousing 145th church anniversary address.

== See also ==
- National Register of Historic Places listings in Little Rock, Arkansas
