= Isaac Taylor House =

Historic house in North Carolina, United States

- U.S. National Register of Historic Places
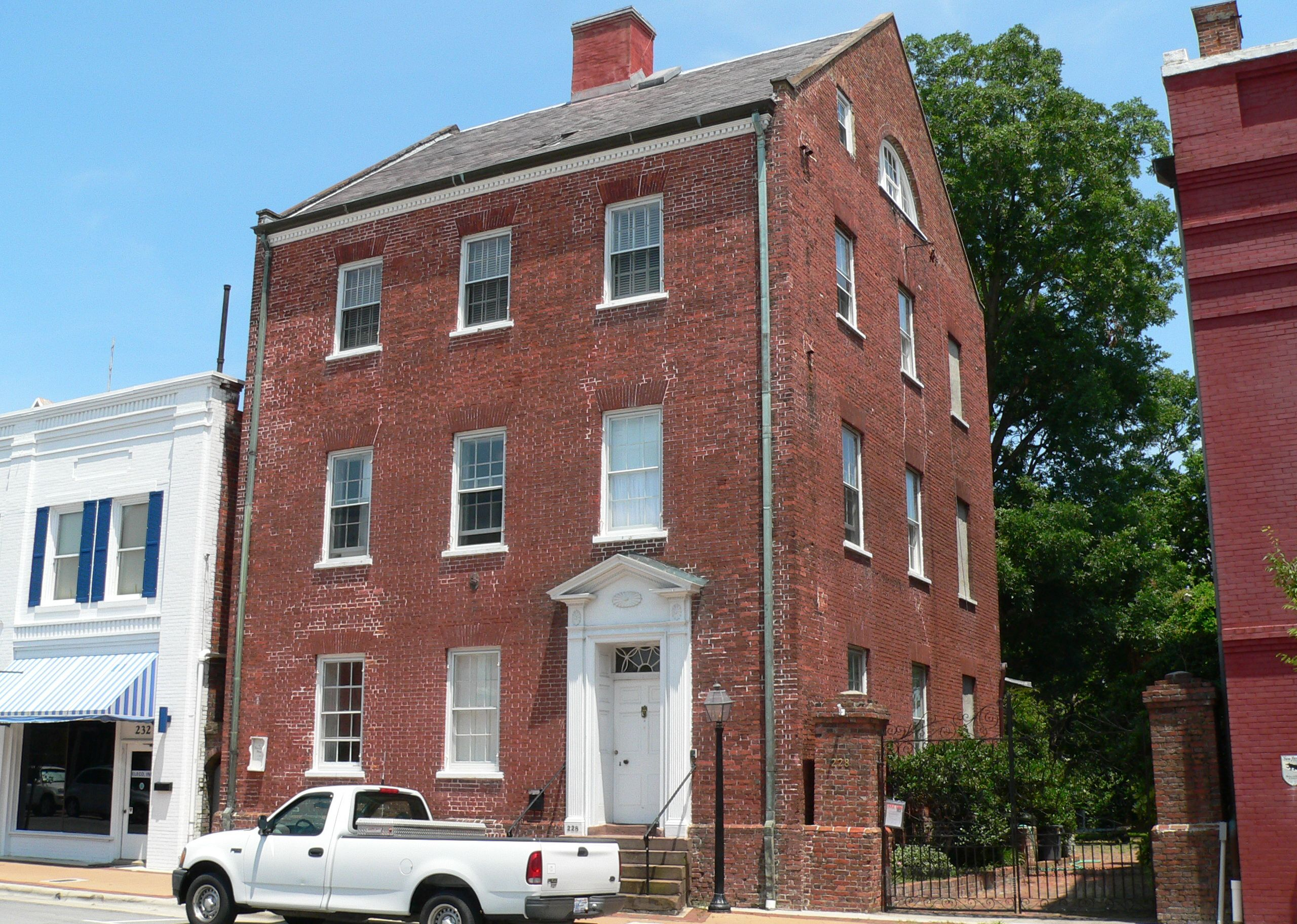
- Isaac Taylor House, July 2006

- Location within North Carolina Location within the United States
- Location: 228 Craven St., New Bern, North Carolina
- Coordinates: 35°6′19″N 77°2′18″W
- Area: 0.3 acres (0.12 ha)
- Built: 1792
- Architectural style: Federal
- NRHP reference No.: 72000953
- Added to NRHP: December 27, 1972

Isaac Taylor House, also known as the Taylor-Ward House, is a historic home located at New Bern, Craven County, North Carolina. It was built about 1796, and is a three-story, three-bay, side hall plan Federal-style Flemish bond brick dwelling.

It was listed on the National Register of Historic Places in 1972.
