= Riverside Historic District (New Bern, North Carolina) =

Historic district in North Carolina, United States

- U.S. National Register of Historic Places
- U.S. Historic district
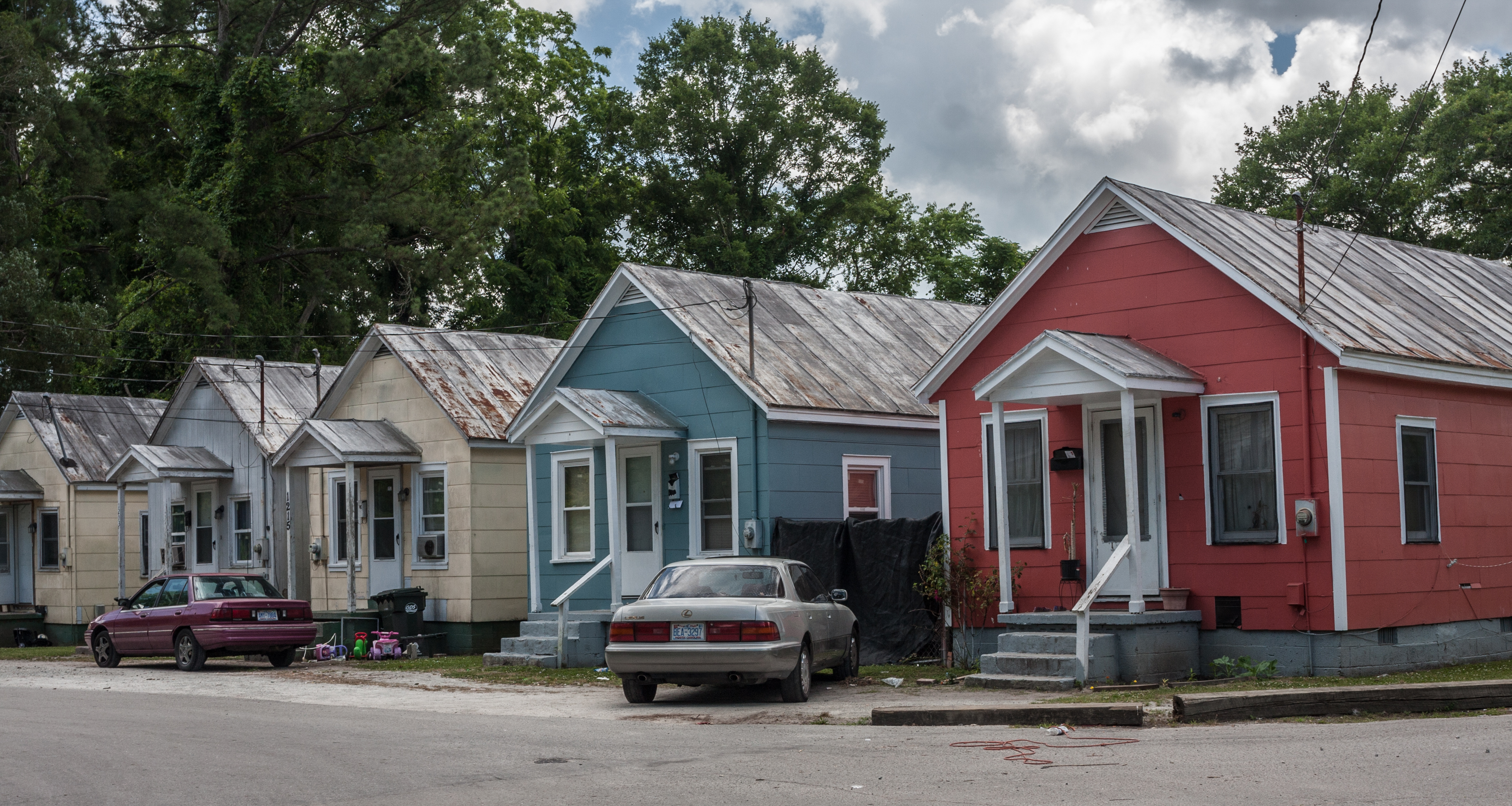
- Bungalow houses within the Riverside Historic District

- Location within North Carolina Location within the United States
- Location: Roughly bounded by N. Craven St., North Ave., E St., and Guion St., New Bern, North Carolina
- Coordinates: 35°7′9″N 77°2′51″W
- Area: 48 acres (19 ha)
- Architect: Simpson, Herbert Woodley; Et al.
- Architectural style: Classical Revival, Bungalow/craftsman, Queen Anne
- NRHP reference No.: 87002579
- Added to NRHP: February 9, 1988

Riverside Historic District is a national historic district located at New Bern, Craven County, North Carolina. It encompasses 101 contributing buildings and 4 contributing sites developed as a suburban residential neighborhood in New Bern between 1894 and 1921. The district is characterized by dwellings in the Classical Revival, Queen Anne, and Bungalow / American Craftsman styles. Notable non-residential buildings include the Riverside Graded School, Riverside United Methodist Church, S. B. Parker Company Building, Sadler's store, and Hawkins Grocery Store.

It was listed on the National Register of Historic Places in 1988.
