= Edward R. Stanly House =

Historic house in North Carolina, United States

- U.S. National Register of Historic Places
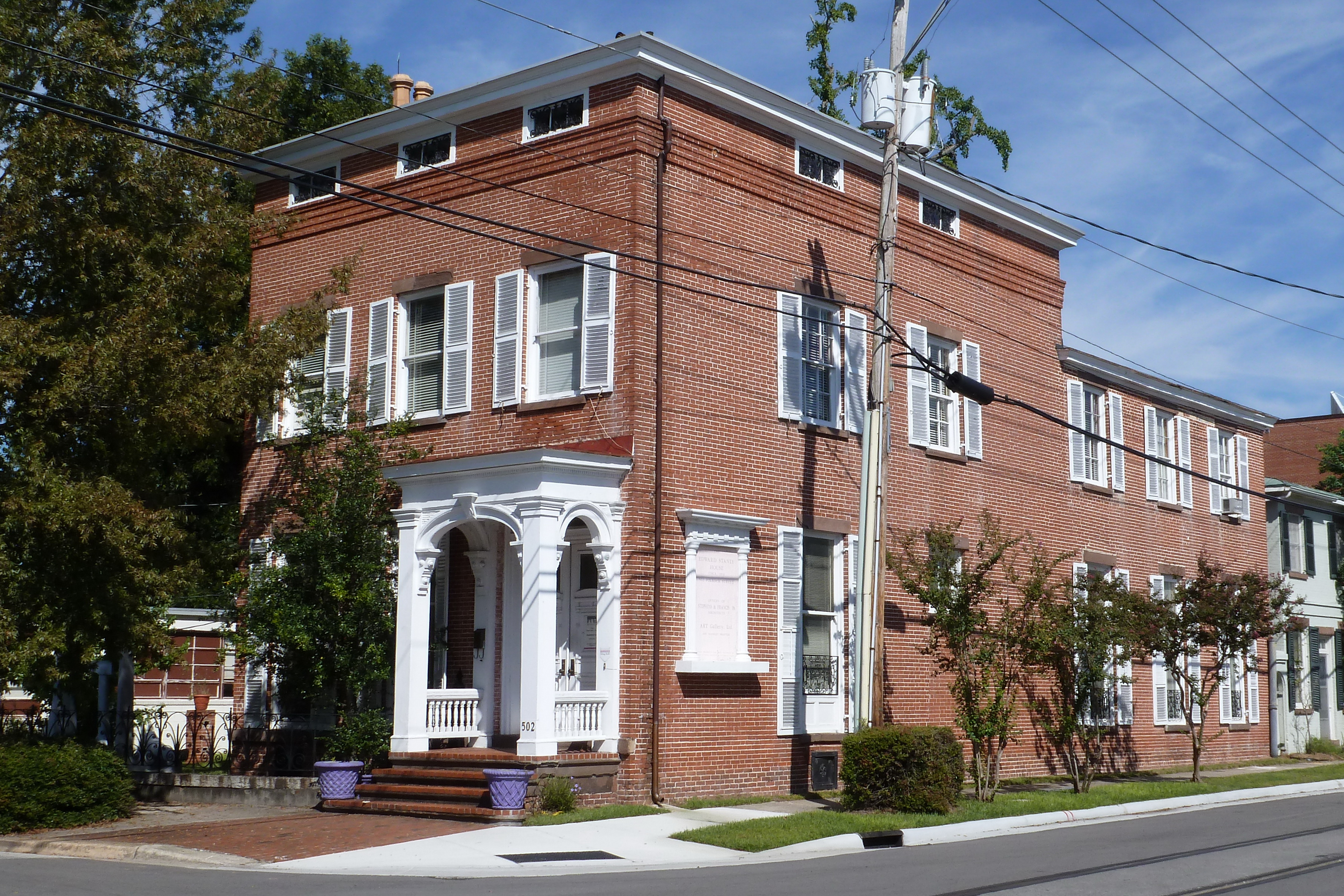
- Edward R. Stanly House, September 2012

- Location within North Carolina Location within the United States
- Location: 502 Pollock St., New Bern, North Carolina
- Coordinates: 35°6′31″N 77°2′31″W
- Area: 0.5 acres (0.20 ha)
- Built: 1850
- Architectural style: Renaissance
- NRHP reference No.: 72000952
- Added to NRHP: March 24, 1972

Edward R. Stanly House is a historic home located at New Bern, Craven County, North Carolina. It was built about 1850, and is a Renaissance Revival-style brick dwelling with a three-story, side-hall plan rectangular main block and a two-story wing two bays wide and two bays deep. The brickwork is laid in Flemish bond.

It was listed on the National Register of Historic Places in 1972.
