= Craven Terrace =

Historic apartment complex in North Carolina, United States

- U.S. National Register of Historic Places
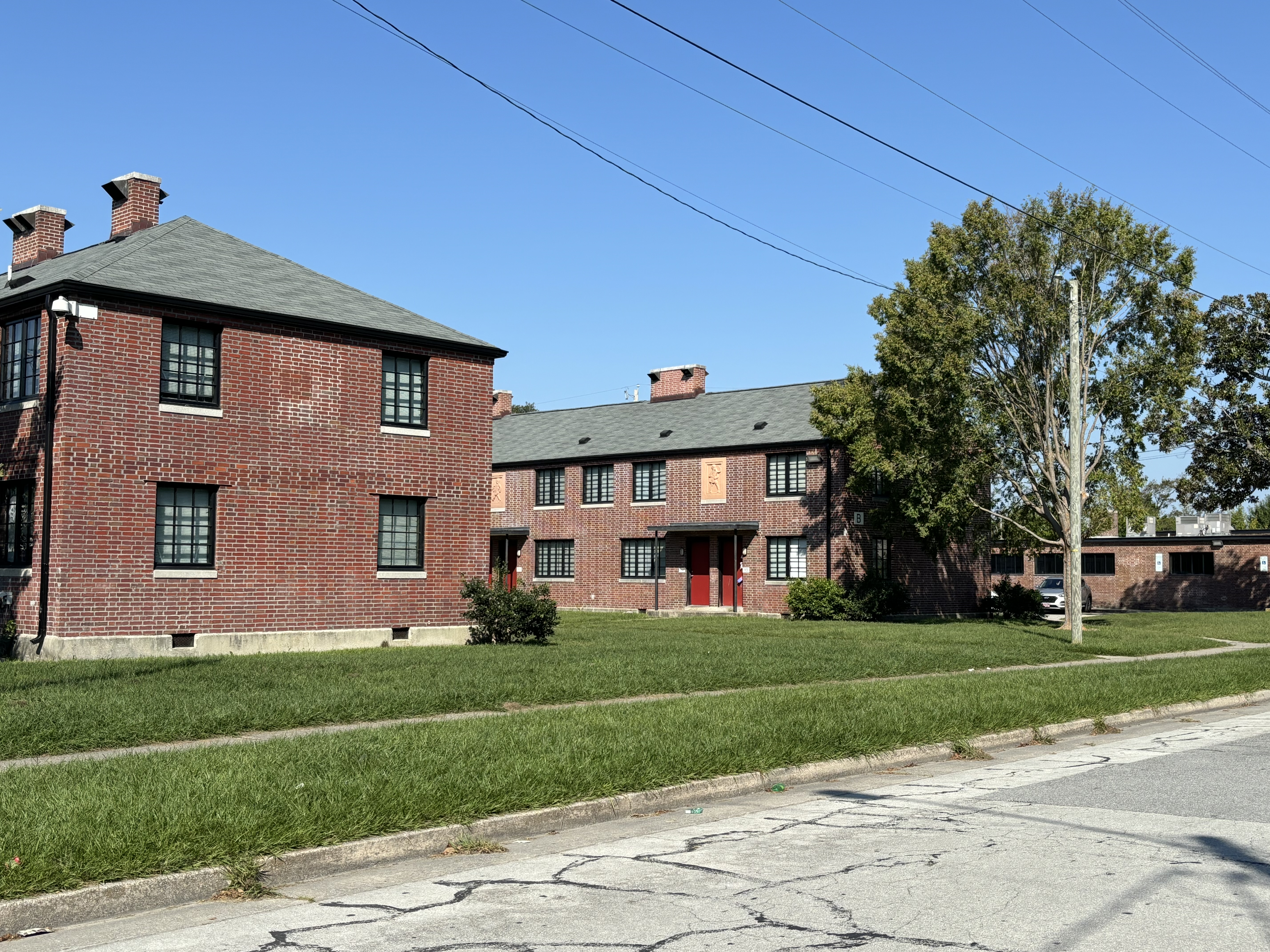
- Craven Terrace in 2024

- Location within North Carolina Location within the United States
- Location: 601 Roundtree St. New Bern, North Carolina
- Coordinates: 35°06′34″N 77°02′57″W
- Area: 21.95 acres (8.88 ha)
- Built: 1942, 1953
- Architect: Wooten, Adolphus Mitchell; Rowland, John Judson
- Architectural style: Colonial Revival, Moderne
- NRHP reference No.: 14000517
- Added to NRHP: August 19, 2014

Craven Terrace is a historic apartment complex located at New Bern, Craven County, North Carolina. The complex was built in two stages in 1942 and 1953, and consists of 46 apartment buildings, a one-story brick community building (1942). The buildings include elements of Colonial Revival and Moderne style design elements. The brickwork of the 1953 apartments and maintenance building are laid in six courses of stretchers to a course of Flemish bond. The complex was built as a low-income residential development for African American residents of New Bern and was funded by the United States Housing Authority.

It was listed on the National Register of Historic Places in 2014.
