= Ulysses S. Mace House =

Historic house in North Carolina, United States

- U.S. National Register of Historic Places
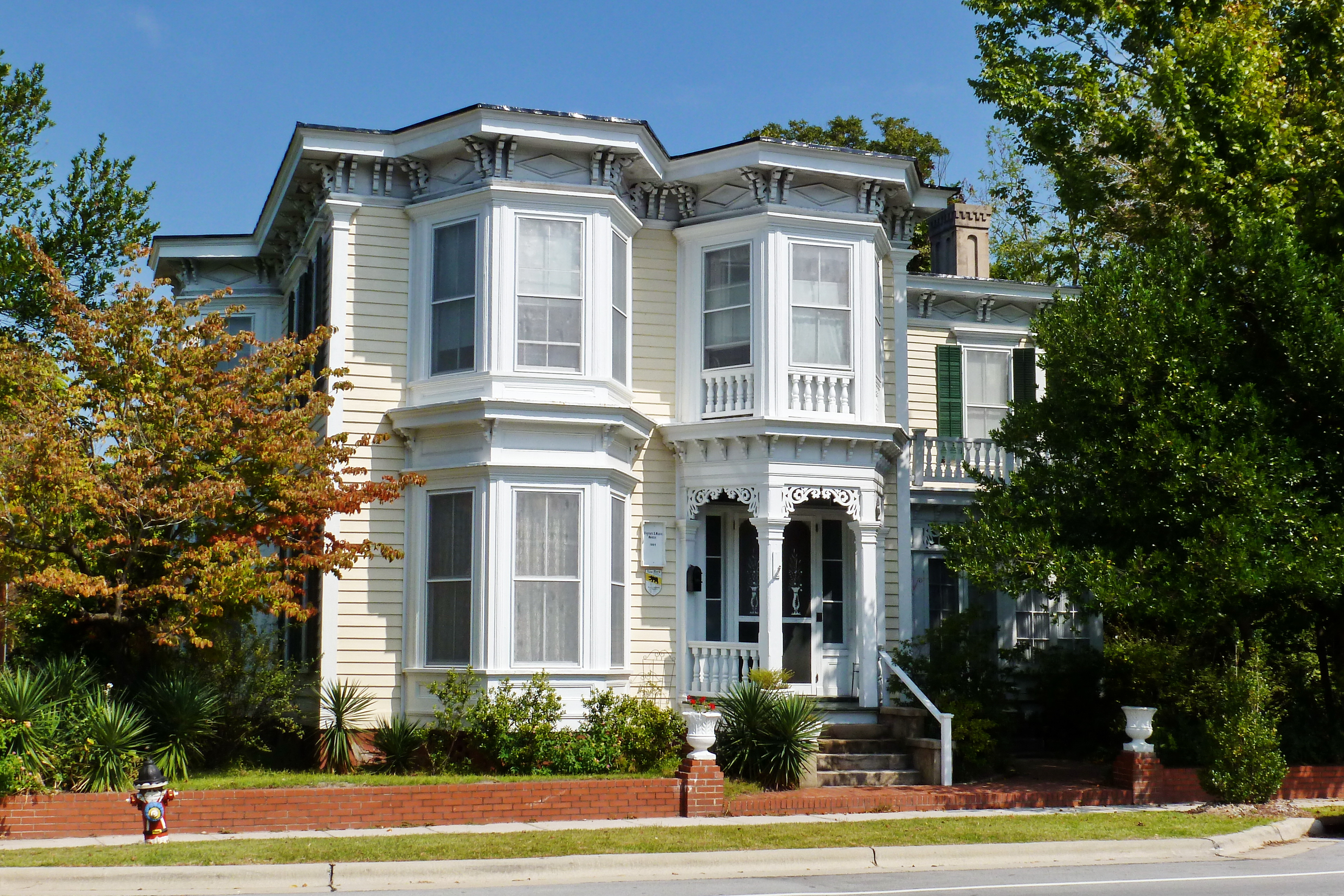
- Ulysses S. Mace House, September 2012

- Location within North Carolina Location within the United States
- Location: 518 Broad St., New Bern, North Carolina
- Coordinates: 35°6′31″N 77°2′34″W
- Area: 0.8 acres (0.32 ha)
- Built: 1885
- Architectural style: Italianate
- NRHP reference No.: 73001324
- Added to NRHP: June 4, 1973

Ulysses S. Mace House is a historic home located at New Bern, Craven County, North Carolina. It was built in 1885, and is a two-story, two-bay by three bay, side-hall plan, Italianate style frame dwelling. It has a side and L-shaped rear wing. It features a series of demi-hexagonal pavilions and the ornate bracketed cornice below a flat roof.

It was listed on the National Register of Historic Places in 1973.
