= William Hollister House =

Historic house in North Carolina, United States

- U.S. National Register of Historic Places
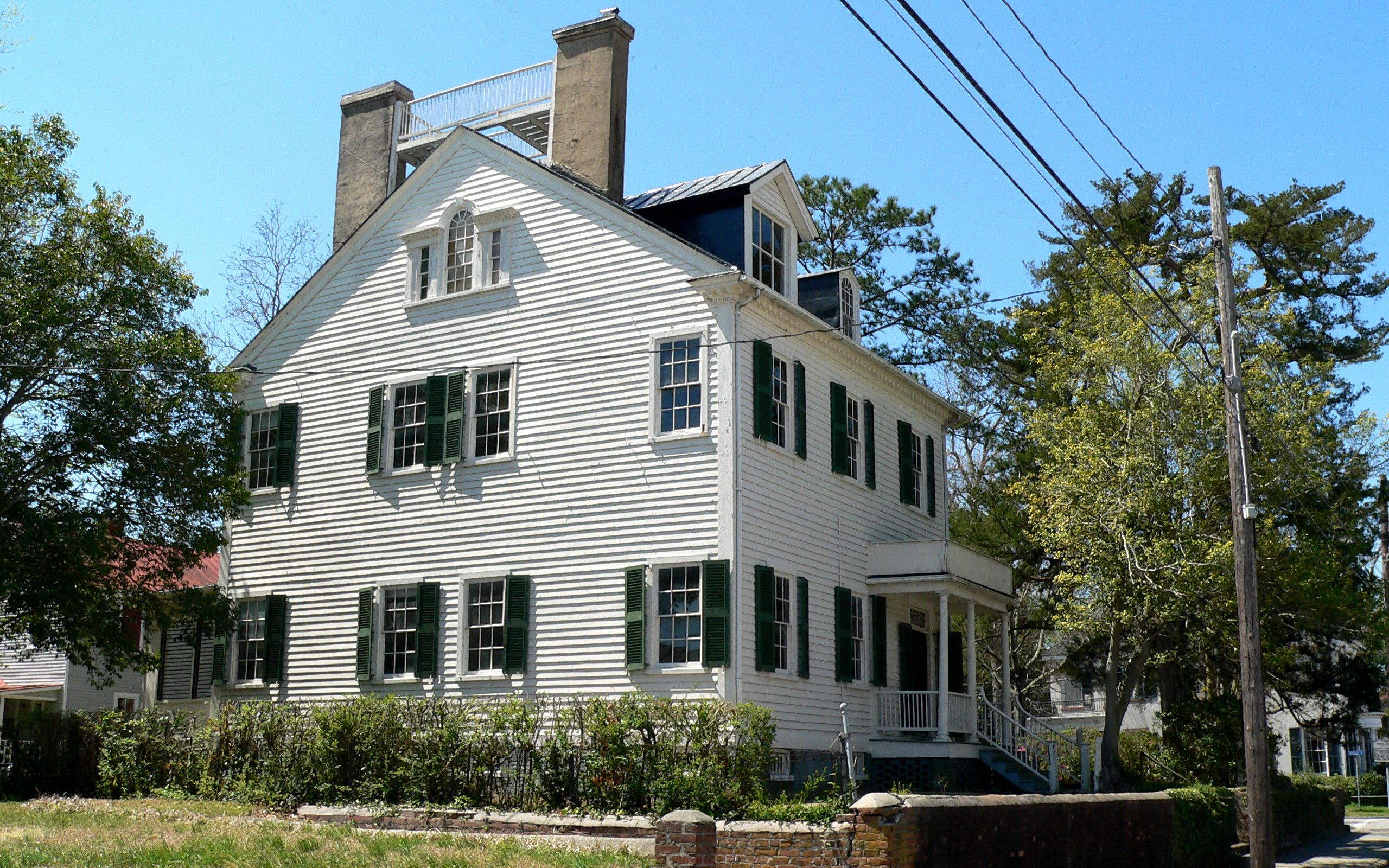
- William Hollister House, April 2006

- Location within North Carolina Location within the United States
- Location: 613 Broad St., New Bern, North Carolina
- Coordinates: 35°6′33″N 77°2′40″W
- Area: less than one acre
- Built: 1840-1841
- Architectural style: Federal
- NRHP reference No.: 72000944
- Added to NRHP: June 30, 1972

William Hollister House is a historic home located at New Bern, Craven County, North Carolina. It was built in 1840–1841, and is a 2 1/2-story, three-bay, side-hall plan, Federal style frame dwelling. It has a gable roof and a single-story, one-room wing.

It was listed on the National Register of Historic Places in 1972.
