= Hawks House =

Historic house in North Carolina, United States

- U.S. National Register of Historic Places
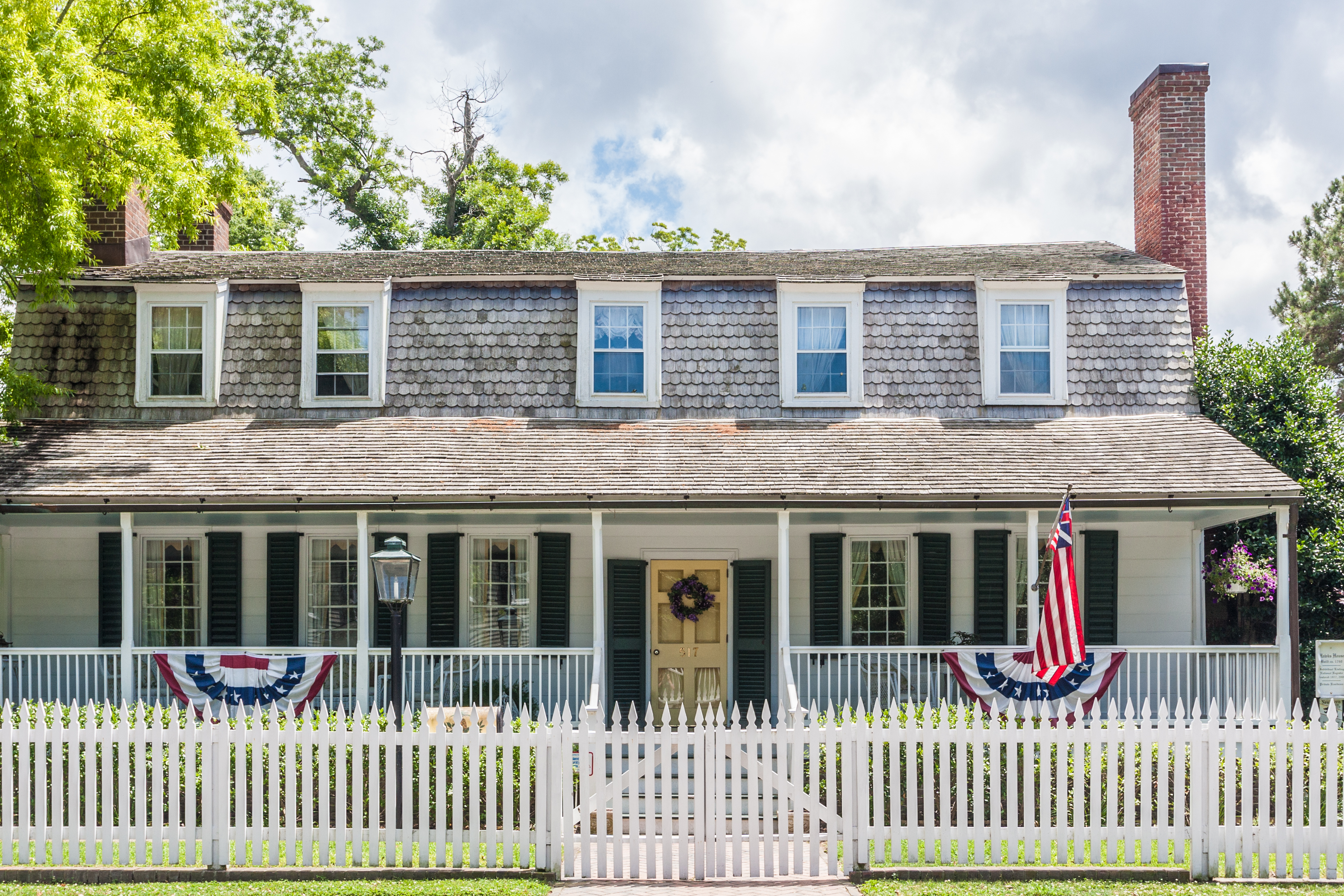
- Hawks House, May 2013

- Location within North Carolina Location within the United States
- Location: 306 Hancock St., New Bern, North Carolina
- Coordinates: 35°6′27″N 77°2′29″W
- Area: 0.5 acres (0.20 ha)
- Built: c. 1780-1810
- NRHP reference No.: 72000943
- Added to NRHP: March 16, 1972

Hawks House is a historic home located at New Bern, Craven County, North Carolina. It was built between about 1780 and 1810, and is a 1 1/2-story, six bay by two bay, frame dwelling with a gambrel roof. Between 1807 and 1832, it was the home of Francis Hawks, son of architect John Hawks. It was moved in the 1970s to 517 New Street.

It was listed on the National Register of Historic Places in 1972.
