= St. Paul's Roman Catholic Church (New Bern, North Carolina) =

Historic church in North Carolina, United States

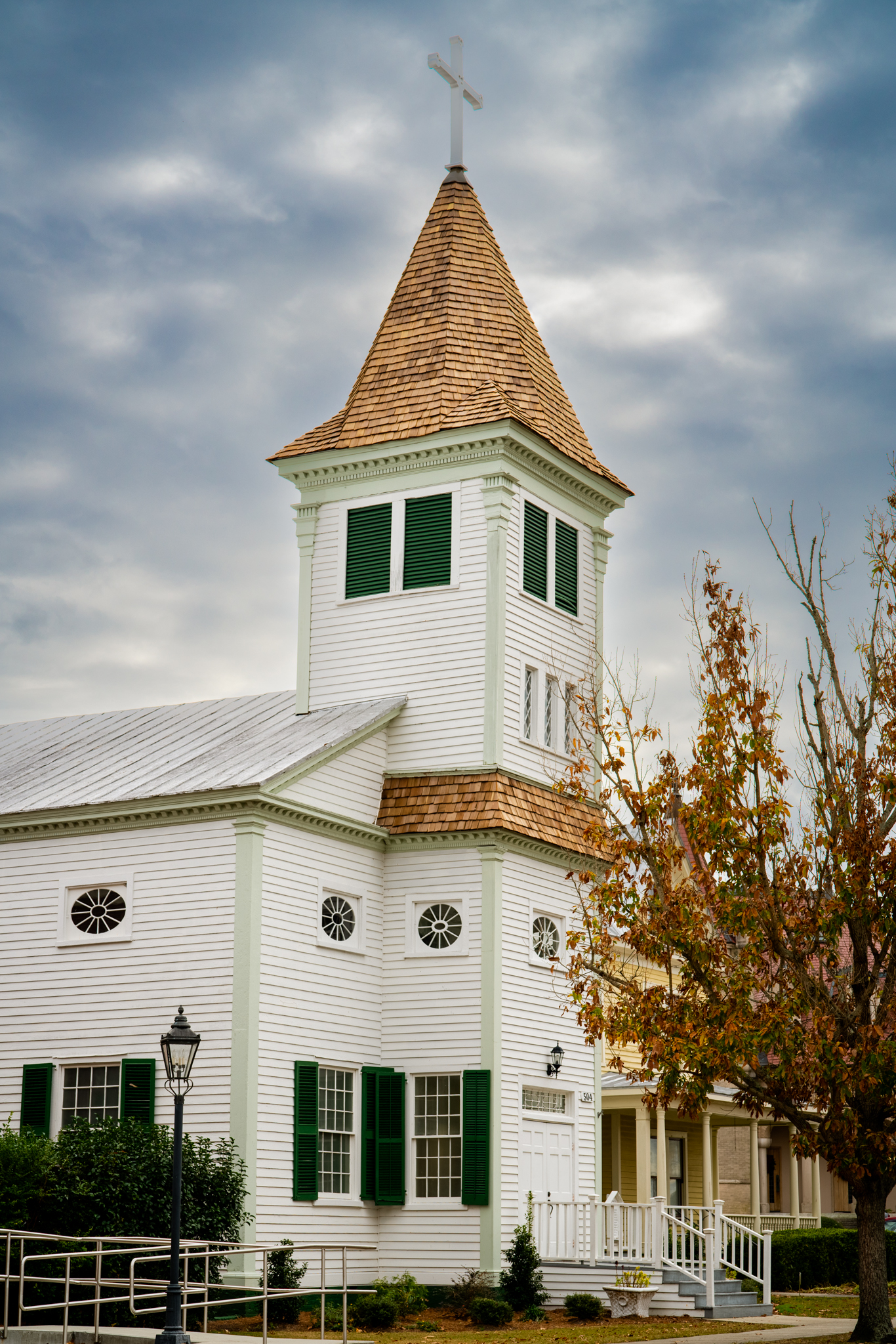
The church

Saint Paul Catholic Church is a Catholic parish in New Bern, North Carolina, within the jurisdiction of the Diocese of Raleigh. Its Main Campus is located at 3005 Country Club Rd. Its historic parish church is located at 504 Middle Street. Although most Masses are held at the main campus, the parish continues to celebrate Friday Mass at 8 a.m. at the historic church. The parish also hosts a parochial school, St. Paul Catholic School.

The historic church, built in 1840–1841 and the oldest Catholic church in North Carolina, is a Greek Revival rectangular frame structure three bays wide and four bays deep covered by a gable roof. It features a central square projecting entrance tower, added in 1896. It was listed on the National Register of Historic Places in 1972.
