= Blades House =

Historic house in North Carolina, United States

- U.S. National Register of Historic Places
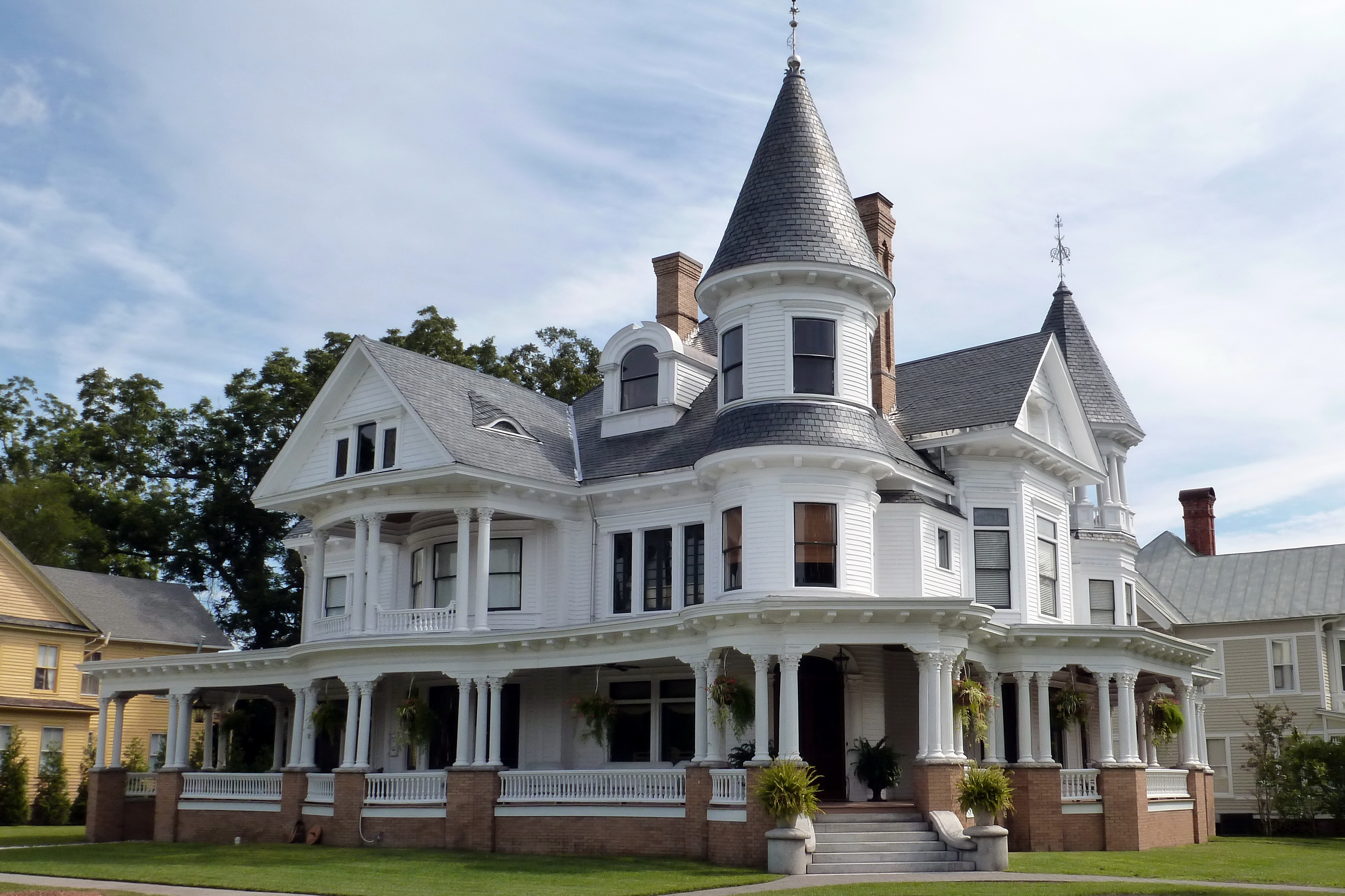

- Location within North Carolina Location within the United States
- Location: 602 Middle St., New Bern, North Carolina
- Coordinates: 35°6′40″N 77°2′21″W
- Area: 0.5 acres (0.20 ha)
- Built: 1903
- Architect: Simpson, Herbert W.
- Architectural style: Queen Anne
- NRHP reference No.: 72000934
- Added to NRHP: January 14, 1972

The Blades House, also known as the W.B. Blades House, is an historic house located at 602 Middle Street, in New Bern, North Carolina, in the United States. Built in 1907 for lumber magnate William B. Blades, it was designed in the Queen Anne style by prolific local architect Herbert Woodley Simpson. On January 14, 1972, it was added to the National Register of Historic Places.

== See also ==
- List of Registered Historic Places in North Carolina
