= Isaac H. Smith Jr. House =

Historic house in North Carolina, United States

- U.S. National Register of Historic Places
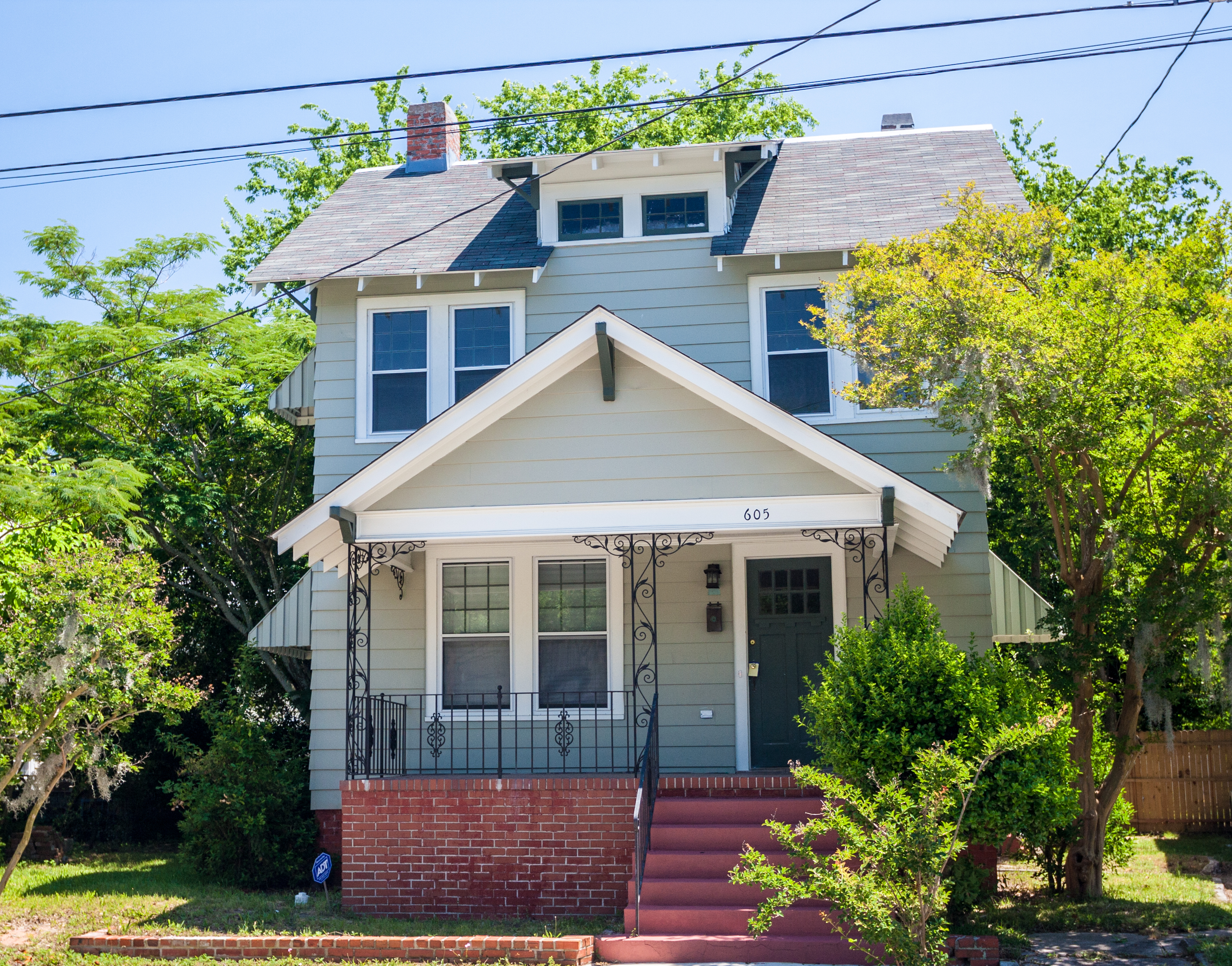
- Isaac H. Smith Jr. House, May 2013

- Location within North Carolina Location within the United States
- Location: 605 Johnson St., New Bern, North Carolina
- Coordinates: 35°6′37″N 77°2′37″W
- Area: less than one acre
- Built: 1923-1924
- Architectural style: Bungalow/craftsman
- NRHP reference No.: 02000965
- Added to NRHP: September 14, 2002

Isaac H. Smith Jr. House is a historic home located at New Bern, Craven County, North Carolina. It was built between 1923 and 1924, and is a two-story American Craftsman style frame dwelling with a brick basement and small attic story. It was the home of Isaac H. Smith Jr. (1899–1953), one of New Bern's most financially successful African-American businessmen.

It was listed on the National Register of Historic Places in 2002.
