= First Missionary Baptist Church (New Bern, North Carolina) =

Historic church in North Carolina, United States

- U.S. National Register of Historic Places
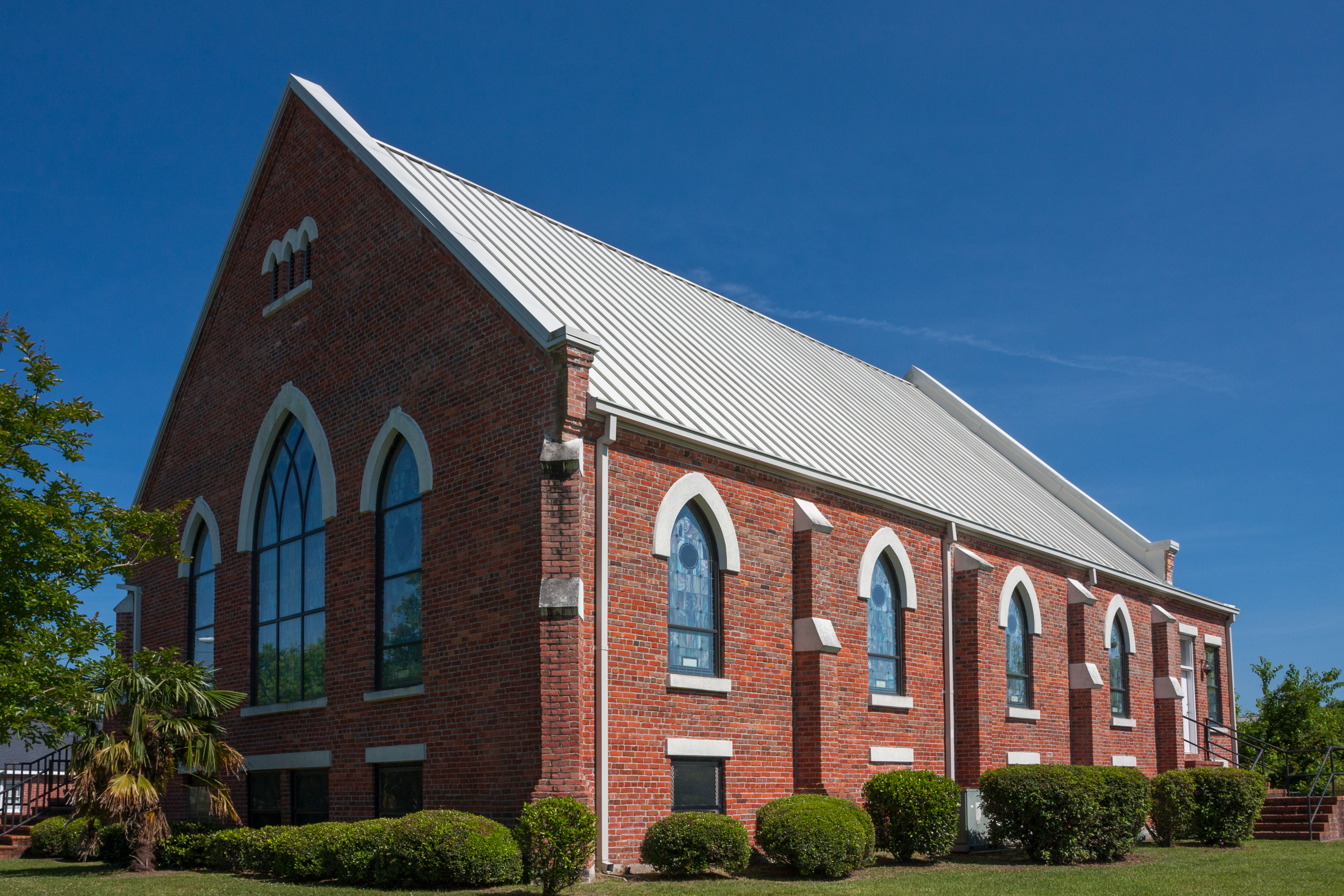

- Location within North Carolina Location within the United States
- Location: 819 Cypress St., New Bern, North Carolina
- Coordinates: 35°6′51″N 77°2′51″W
- Area: less than one acre
- Built: 1906-1908
- Architectural style: Late Gothic Revival
- MPS: Historic African American Churches in Craven County MPS
- NRHP reference No.: 97000574
- Added to NRHP: June 30, 1997

First Missionary Baptist Church is a historic African-American Baptist church located at 819 Cypress Street in New Bern, Craven County, North Carolina. It was built in 1906–1908, and is a rectangular brick church building in the Late Gothic Revival style. It features a two-stage tower.

It was listed on the National Register of Historic Places in 1997.
