= New Bern Historic District =

Historic district in North Carolina, United States

- U.S. National Register of Historic Places
- U.S. Historic district
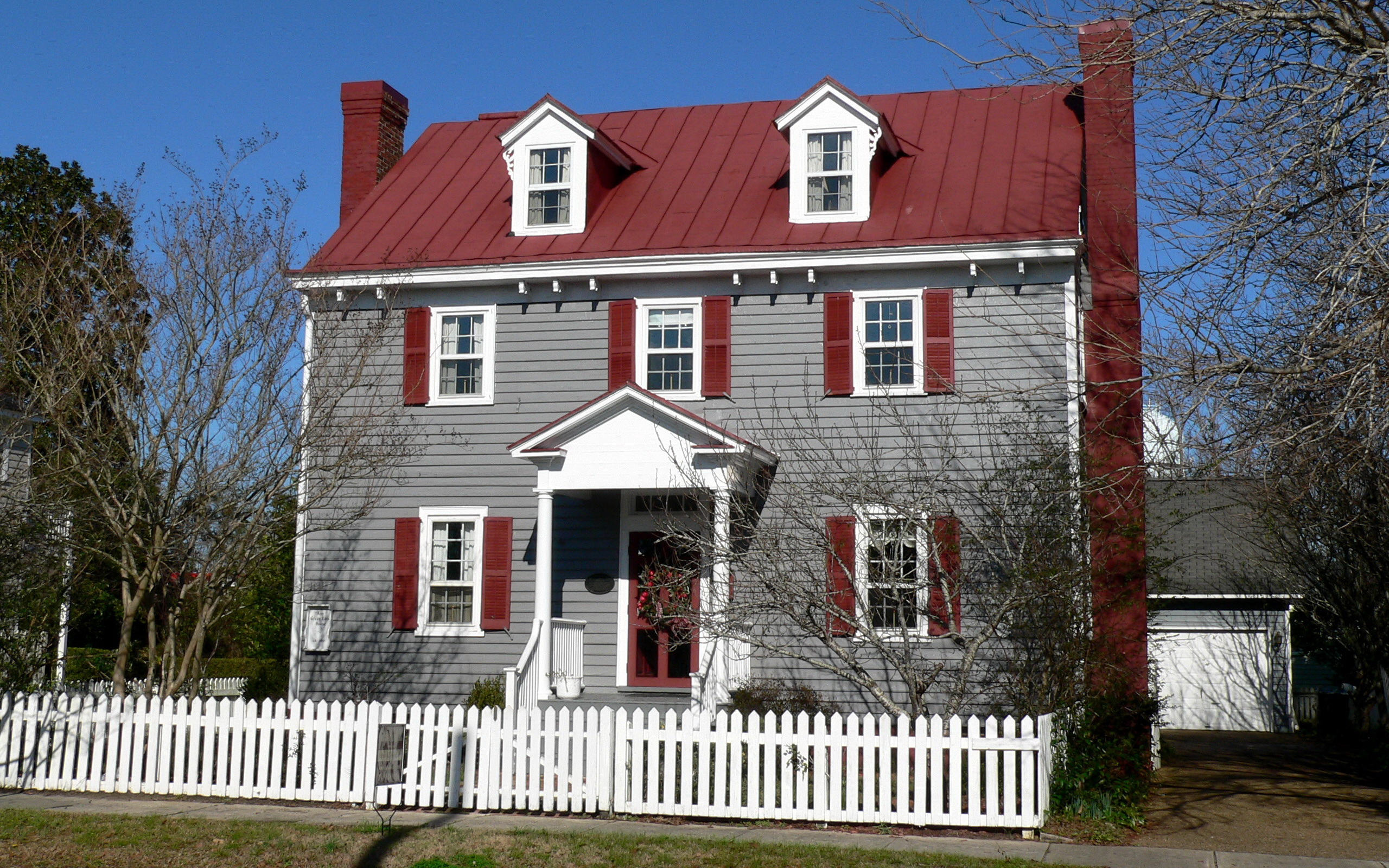
- Anne Green Lane House (1805) in 2012
- Location: Roughly bounded by Neuse and Trent Rivers and Queen St.; roughly 2 blocks of N. Craven, blk on Pasteur St, roughly along Bern, West, Cedar Sts and Trent Court; New Bern, Craven County, North Carolina
- Coordinates: 35°6′56″N 77°2′58″W
- Area: 250 acres (100 ha) (original); 64 acres (26 ha) (size of first increase)
- Built: 1790-1940
- Architect: Wooten, A. Mitchell; Rowland, John J.
- Architectural style: Federal; Mid 19th Century Revival, Late Victorian, etc.
- NRHP reference No.: 73001325 (original); 03000965 (increase 1); 15000956 (increase 2)

Significant dates
- Added to NRHP: June 19, 1973
- Boundary increases: September 25, 2003; January 5, 2016

The New Bern Historic District is a national historic district located at New Bern, Craven County, North Carolina. As of 2003 the district contained 492 contributing structures with construction dates ranging from the early 1800s to the mid-20th century. The district contains notable examples of buildings in the Federal and Late Victorian styles.

It was listed on the National Register of Historic Places in 1973, with boundary expansions in 2003 and 2016.

== See also ==
- National Register of Historic Places listings in Craven County, North Carolina
