= Jerkins-Duffy House =

Historic house in North Carolina, United States

- U.S. National Register of Historic Places
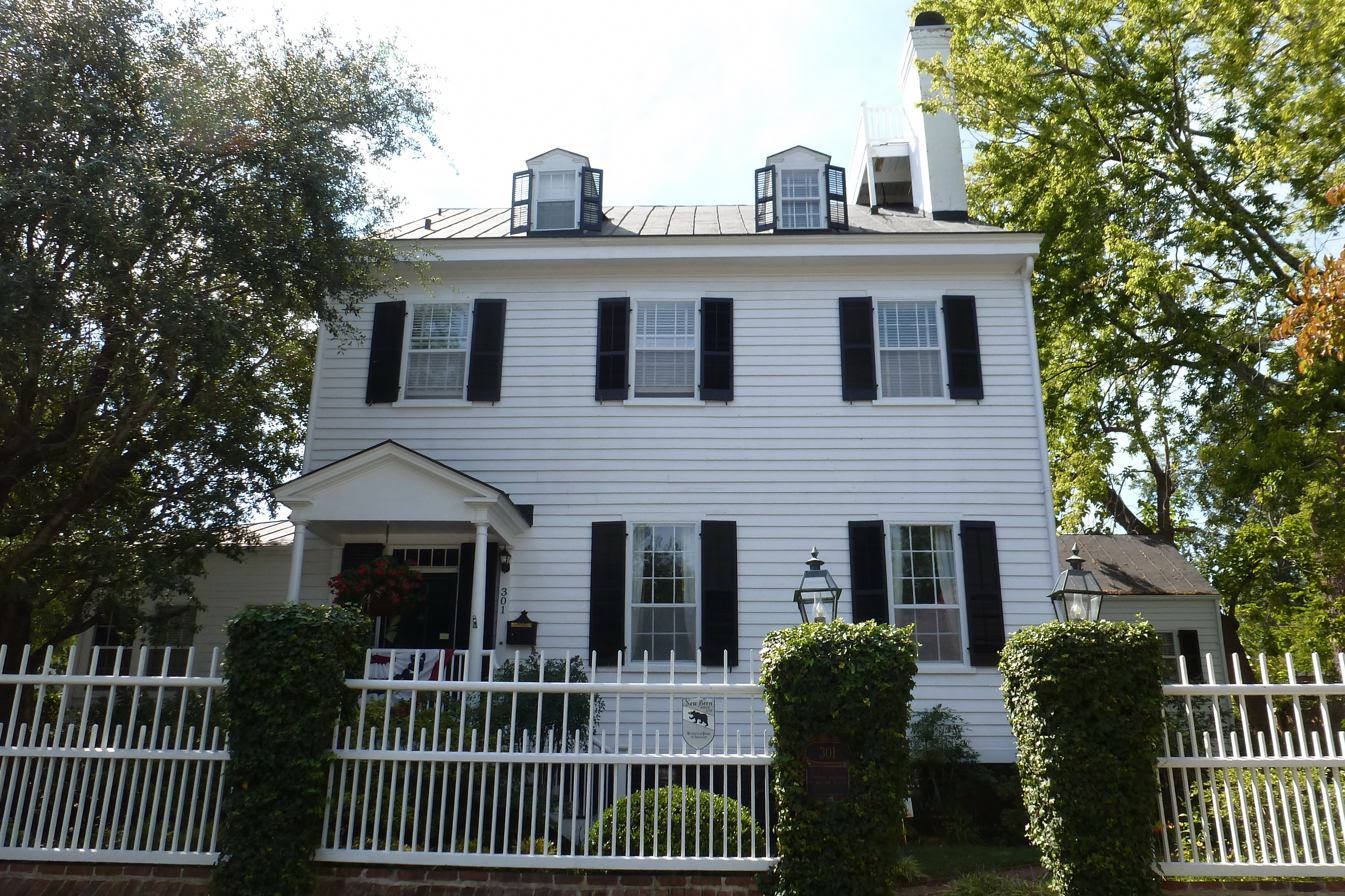
- Jerkins-Duffy House, September 2012

- Location within North Carolina Location within the United States
- Location: 301 Johnston St., New Bern, North Carolina
- Coordinates: 35°6′37″N 77°2′18″W
- Area: less than one acre
- Built: c. 1833
- Architectural style: Greek Revival, Federal
- NRHP reference No.: 88000232
- Added to NRHP: March 17, 1988

Jerkins-Duffy House, also known as the Clarence B. Beasley House, is a historic home located at New Bern, Craven County, North Carolina. It was built about 1833, and is a 2 1/2-story, three-bay, side-hall plan, transitional Federal / Greek Revival style frame dwelling. It has an engaged, full-width two-story rear gallery and one-story wings. It sits on a high brick foundation.

It was listed on the National Register of Historic Places in 1988.
