= Gull Harbor (New Bern, North Carolina) =

Historic house in North Carolina, United States

- U.S. National Register of Historic Places
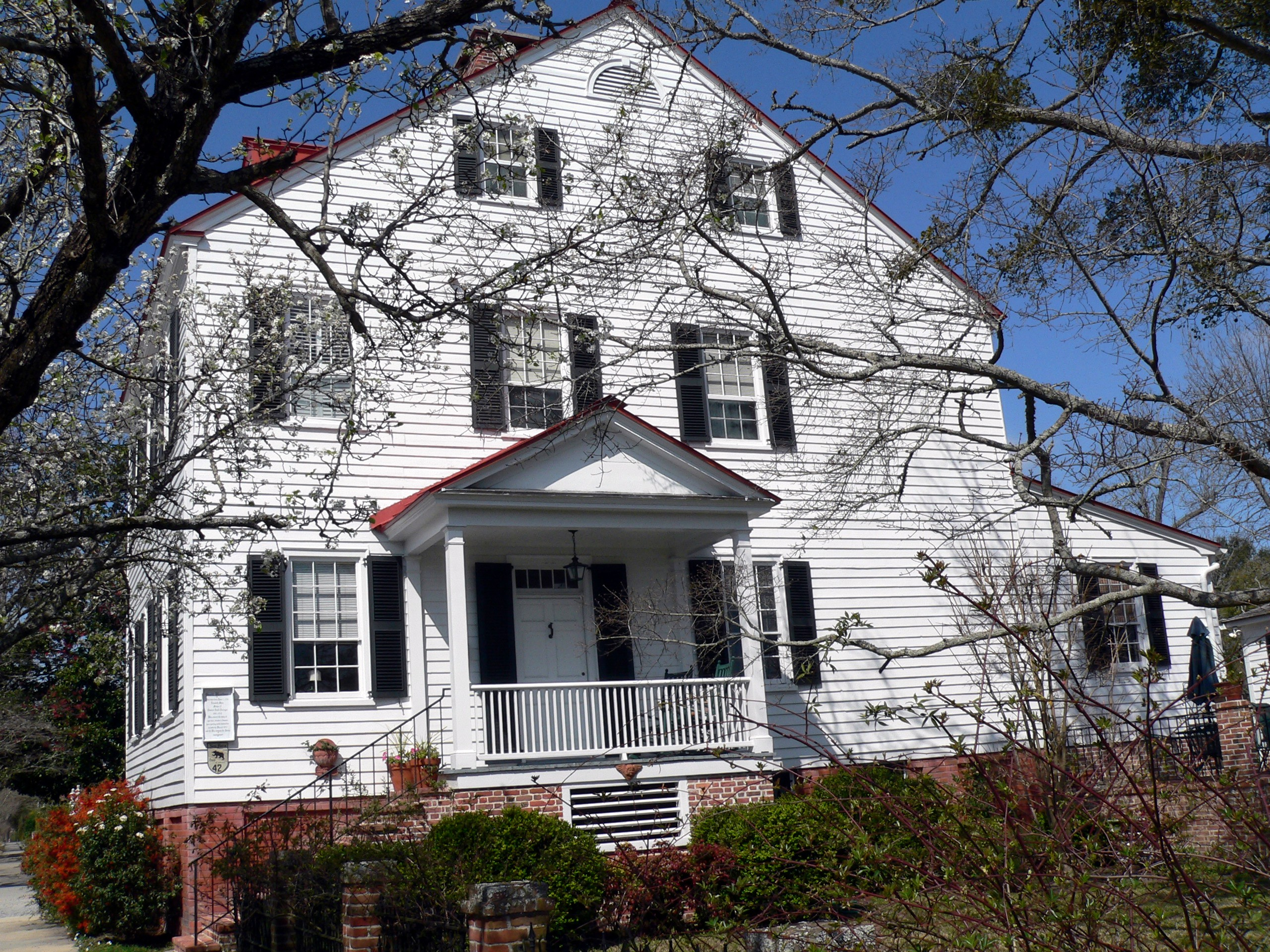
- Gull Harbor, March 2006

- Location within North Carolina Location within the United States
- Location: 514 E. Front St., New Bern, North Carolina
- Coordinates: 35°6′36″N 77°2′8″W
- Area: 0.5 acres (0.20 ha)
- Built: c. 1810
- Architectural style: Federal
- NRHP reference No.: 73001322
- Added to NRHP: August 14, 1973

Gull Harbor is a historic home located at New Bern, Craven County, North Carolina, United States. It was built about 1810, and is a 2 1/2-story, three-bay, side-hall plan, Federal style frame dwelling.

It was listed on the National Register of Historic Places in 1973.
