= Cedar Street Recreation Center =

- U.S. National Register of Historic Places
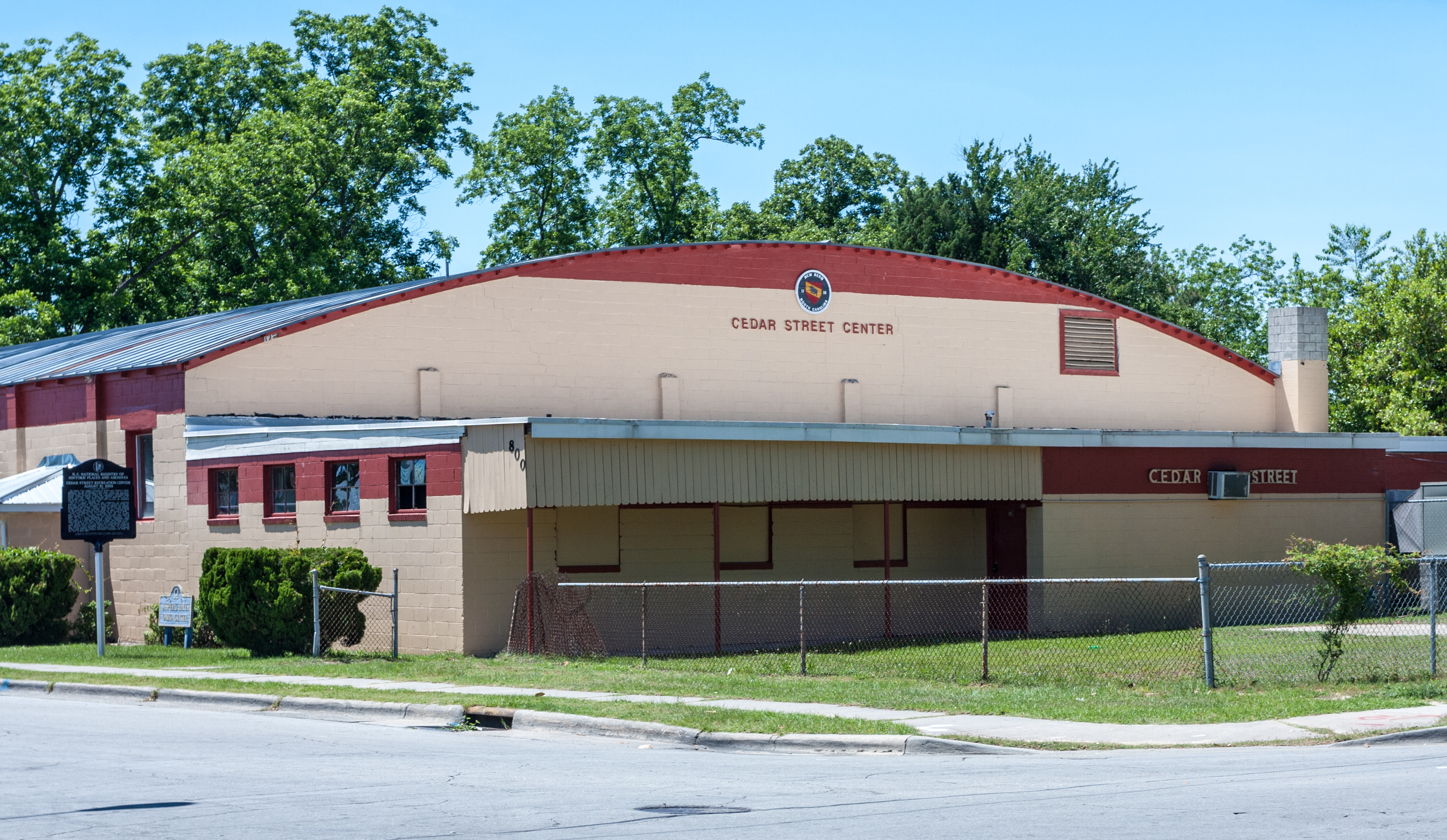
- Cedar Street Recreation Center, May 2013

- Location within North Carolina Location within the United States
- Location: 822 Cedar St., New Bern, North Carolina
- Coordinates: 35°6′44″N 77°2′47″W
- Area: less than one acre
- Built: 1948-1952
- Architectural style: Modern Movement
- NRHP reference No.: 03000802
- Added to NRHP: August 21, 2003

Cedar Street Recreation Center, also known as the Jasper G. Hayes Omega Center, is a historic community center building located at New Bern, Craven County, North Carolina, United States. It was built between 1948 and 1952, and is located in a historically African-American section of New Bern. It consists of a one-story, 110-foot-by-91-foot, concrete-block main block with a 30-foot-by-91-foot wing. The building is in the Modern style. It was initially used as a recreational center and basketball arena for the African-American youth of the community and later as a venue for neighborhood gatherings and social events.

It was listed on the National Register of Historic Places in 2003.
