= Eli Smallwood House =

Historic house in North Carolina, United States

- U.S. National Register of Historic Places
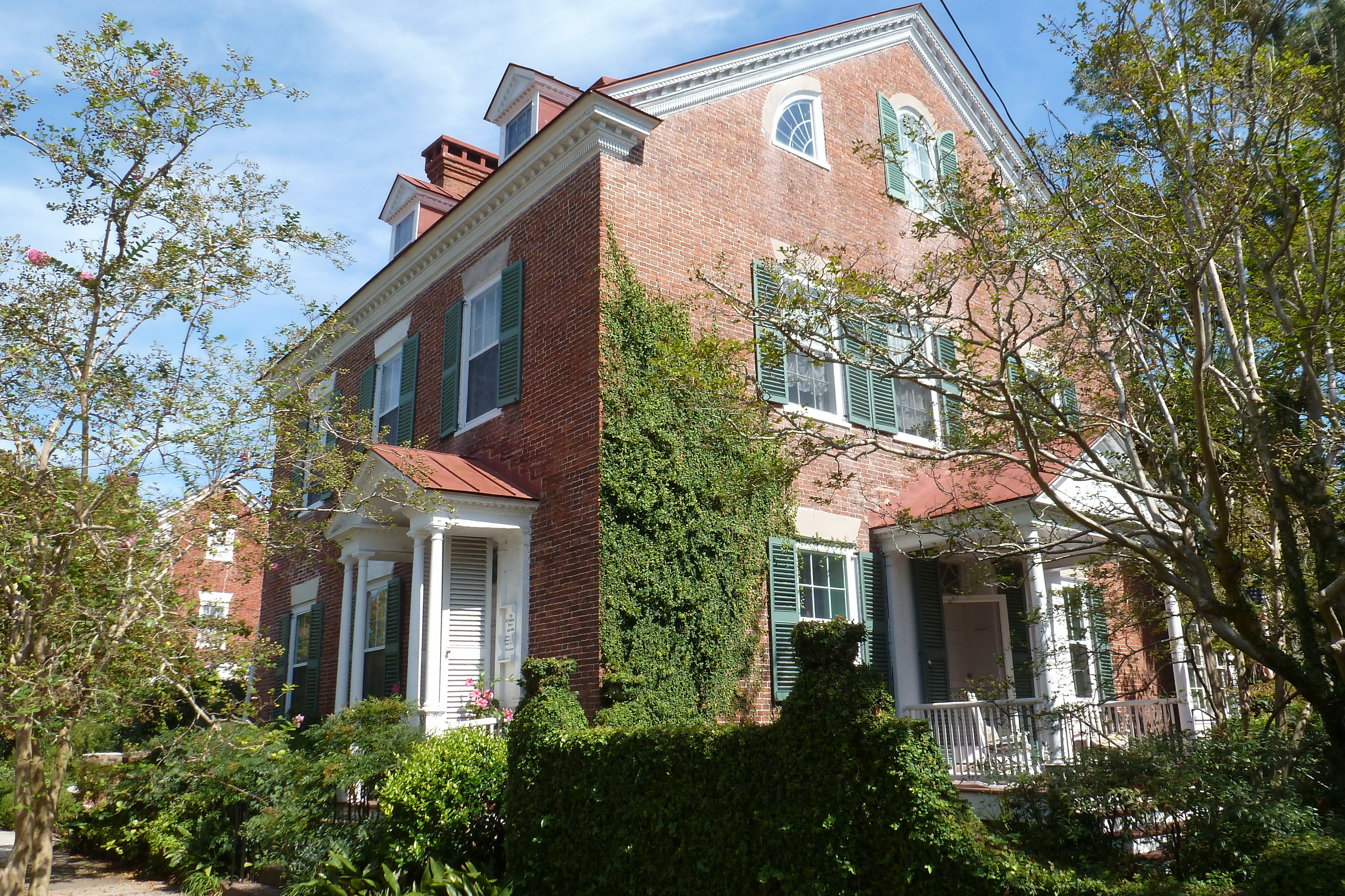
- Eli Smallwood House, September 2012

- Location within North Carolina Location within the United States
- Location: 524 E. Front St., New Bern, North Carolina
- Coordinates: 35°6′39″N 77°2′11″W
- Area: 0.8 acres (0.32 ha)
- Built: c. 1810
- Built by: Dewey, John
- Architectural style: Federal
- NRHP reference No.: 72000948
- Added to NRHP: December 5, 1972

Eli Smallwood House is a historic home located at New Bern, Craven County, North Carolina. It was built about 1810, and is a 2 1/2-story, side-hall plan, Federal-style brick town house. It features hand carved ornaments on the main cornice, the porches, and the dormer. The brickwork is laid in Flemish bond. It was the home of Congressmen Charles R. Thomas (1827-1891) and his son Charles R. Thomas (1861–1931) from 1873 to 1925.

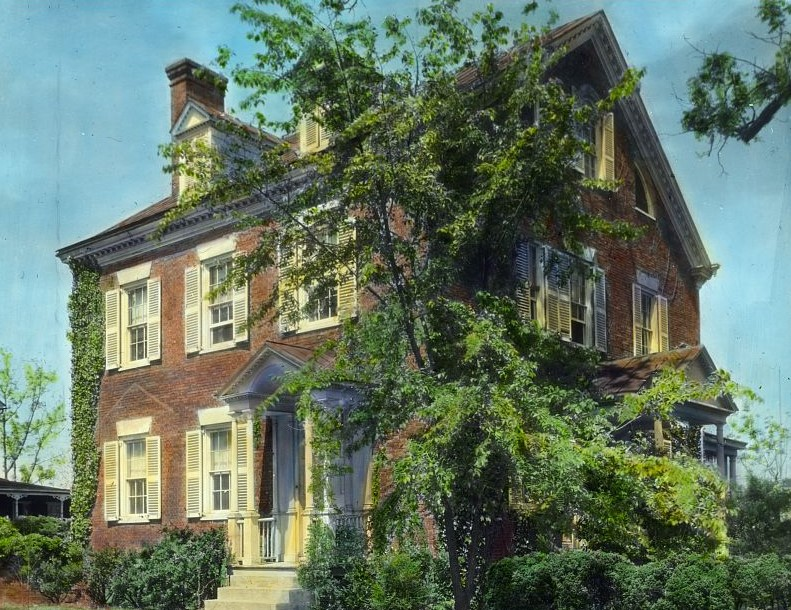
"Smallwood-Ward" house, by Frances Benjamin Johnston, ca. 1930

It was listed on the National Register of Historic Places in 1972.
