= Thomas Jerkins House =

Historic house in North Carolina, United States

- U.S. National Register of Historic Places
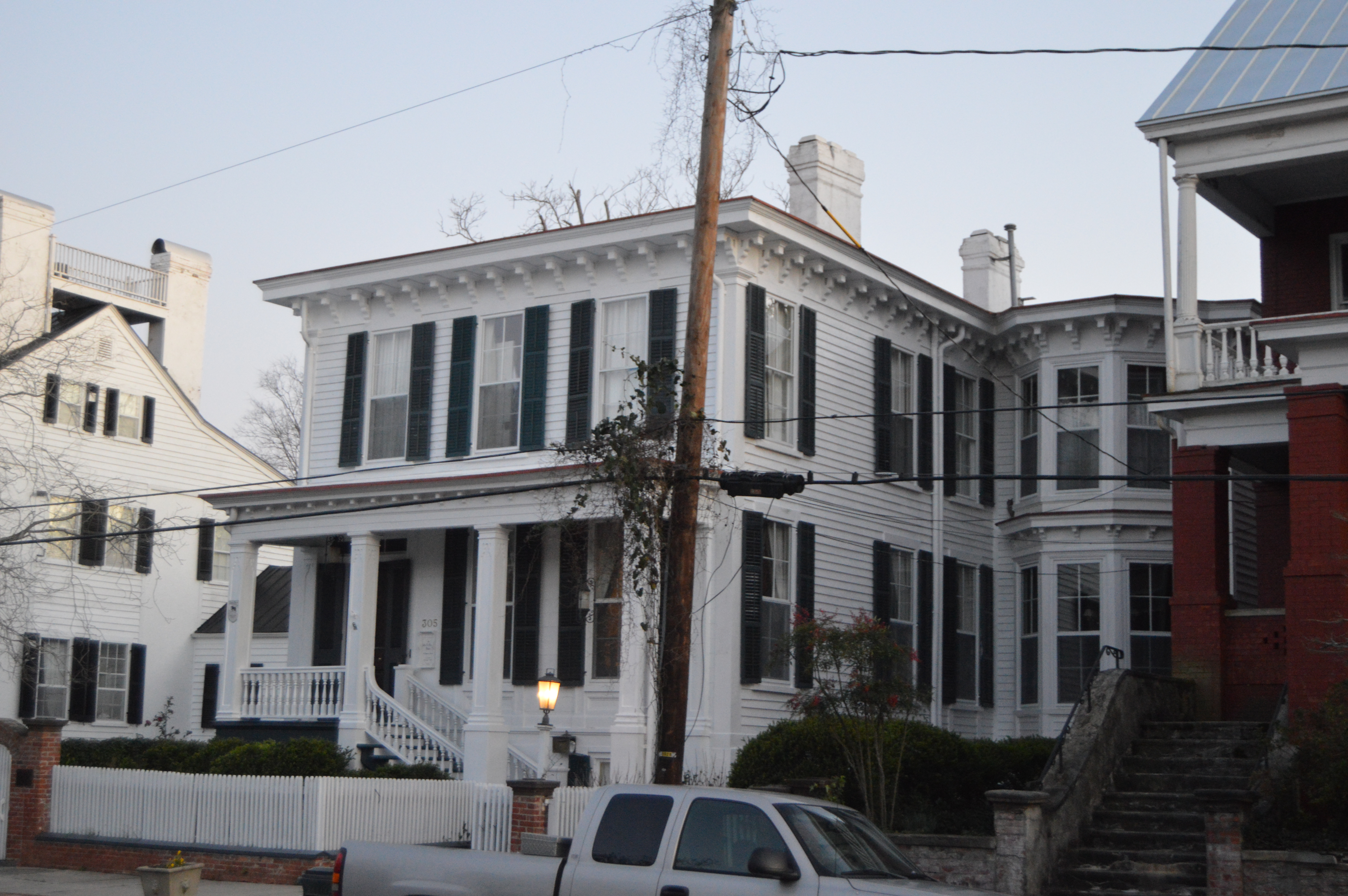
- Front and western side

- Location within North Carolina Location within the United States
- Location: 305 Johnson St., New Bern, North Carolina
- Coordinates: 35°6′38″N 77°2′17″W
- Area: 0.3 acres (0.12 ha)
- Built: c. 1849
- Architectural style: Italianate
- NRHP reference No.: 72000945
- Added to NRHP: October 18, 1972

Thomas Jerkins House is a historic home located at New Bern, Craven County, North Carolina. It was built about 1849, and is a two-story, three-bay, side-hall plan, Italianate style frame dwelling. It has a gable roof with overhanging eaves, a full-width porch, and a two-story ell.

It was listed on the National Register of Historic Places in 1972.
