= Fabius Stanly =

American rear admiral (1815–1882)

Fabius Maximus Stanly
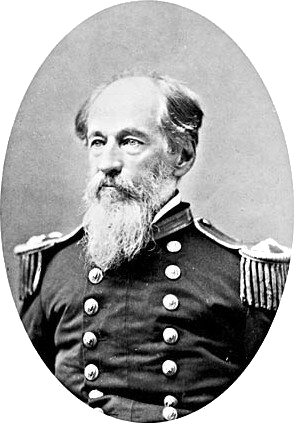
- Born: December 15, 1815; New Bern, North Carolina, U.S.
- Died: December 5, 1882 (aged 66); Washington, D.C., U.S.
- Burial place: Oak Hill Cemetery; Washington, D.C., U.S.
- Relatives: John Stanly (father); Edward Stanly (brother)
- Military career
- Allegiance: United States
- Branch: United States Navy
- Service years: 1831–1874
- Rank: Rear Admiral
- Commands: USS Tuscarora; USS State of Georgia; USS Narragansett; USS Independence; USS Wyandotte; USS Supply; USS Warren
- Conflicts: Mexican–American War; Capture of Guaymas; Capture of Mazatlán; Paraguay Expedition; American Civil War

Fabius Maximus Stanly (December 15, 1815 – December 5, 1882) was a rear admiral of the United States Navy, who served during the Mexican–American War and the American Civil War.

== Early life ==
Fabius Maximus Stanly was born on December 15, 1815, in New Bern, North Carolina, to John Stanly. His father was the speaker of the North Carolina House of Commons and U.S. Representative from North Carolina. His grandfather was John Wright Stanly, a veteran of the American Revolutionary War.

== Career ==
Stanly was appointed midshipman on December 20, 1831. He sailed on the frigate USS Constellation from 1832 to 1834. He then served in a variety of places, including Hudson, Concord, Warren, Consort, Falmouth, the Pacific Ocean, Delaware and Brazil until 1843. He was promoted to lieutenant on September 8, 1841. He commanded the sloop USS Warren in 1854. He was the executive officer of the Mare Island Navy Yard in 1855.

During the Mexican–American War, Stanly was assigned to the Pacific Squadron and participated in the capture of California and the defense of San Francisco. He also took part in several land raids and, during the Capture of Guaymas, led a party of 30 sailors on a cannon-spiking raid in the midst of 1,500 enemy troops. He completed his mission successfully, returning to the boats with all his wounded and some prisoners to boot. He also participated in the Capture of Mazatlán and received a knife wound to the chest.

After the Mexican–American War, Stanly commanded steamers of the Pacific Mail Steamship Company from 1850 to 1851, and during the Paraguay expedition commanded the store ship Supply. From June 1859 to December 1860, he was commander of the steamer USS Wyandotte in the West Indian Squadron. On May 9, 1860, Wyandotte captured the slave ship William off the coast of Cuba. After his service with the Wyandotte, Stanly was sent to California to command the receiving ship USS Independence at the Mare Island Navy Yard.

After the start of the American Civil War, Stanly was commissioned as commander on May 19, 1861, and served as commanding officer of the steamer Narragansett in the Pacific Squadron from April 1862 to October 1863. He also served as a diplomat with Mexico. In November 1863, Stanly joined the Mississippi River Squadron at Cairo, Illinois as ordnance officer. From November 1864 to April 1865, he was given command of the side-wheel steamer USS State of Georgia and cruised off the coast of South Carolina, including participating in the expedition of Bull's Run.

After the Civil War, Stanly was commander of the sloop of war USS Tuscarora in the Pacific Squadron from June 1865 to November 1867. He was commissioned captain on July 25, 1866, commodore on July 1, 1870, and rear admiral on February 12, 1874. Stanly retired from the Navy on June 4, 1874.

== Personal life ==
His sister married General Walker Keith Armistead. His brother, Edward Stanly, served as the North Carolina Attorney General and as speaker in the North Carolina House of Commons.

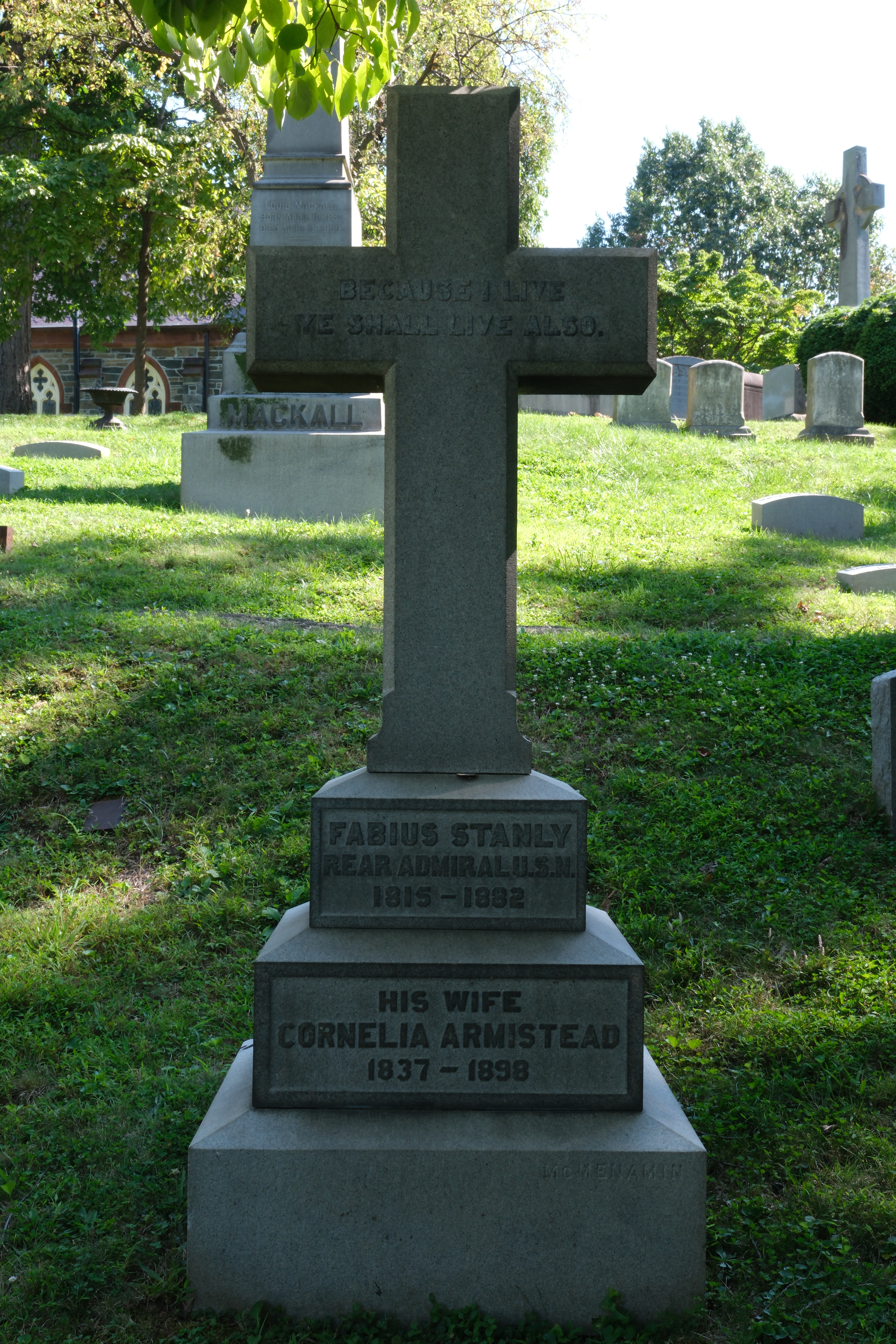
Grave of Stanly at Oak Hill Cemetery

Stanly died in Washington, D.C., on December 5, 1882. He was buried at Oak Hill Cemetery in Washington, D.C.

== Legacy ==
In 1941, the destroyer USS Stanly (DD-478) was named in his honor.
