= Edward Stanly =

American politician (1810–1872)

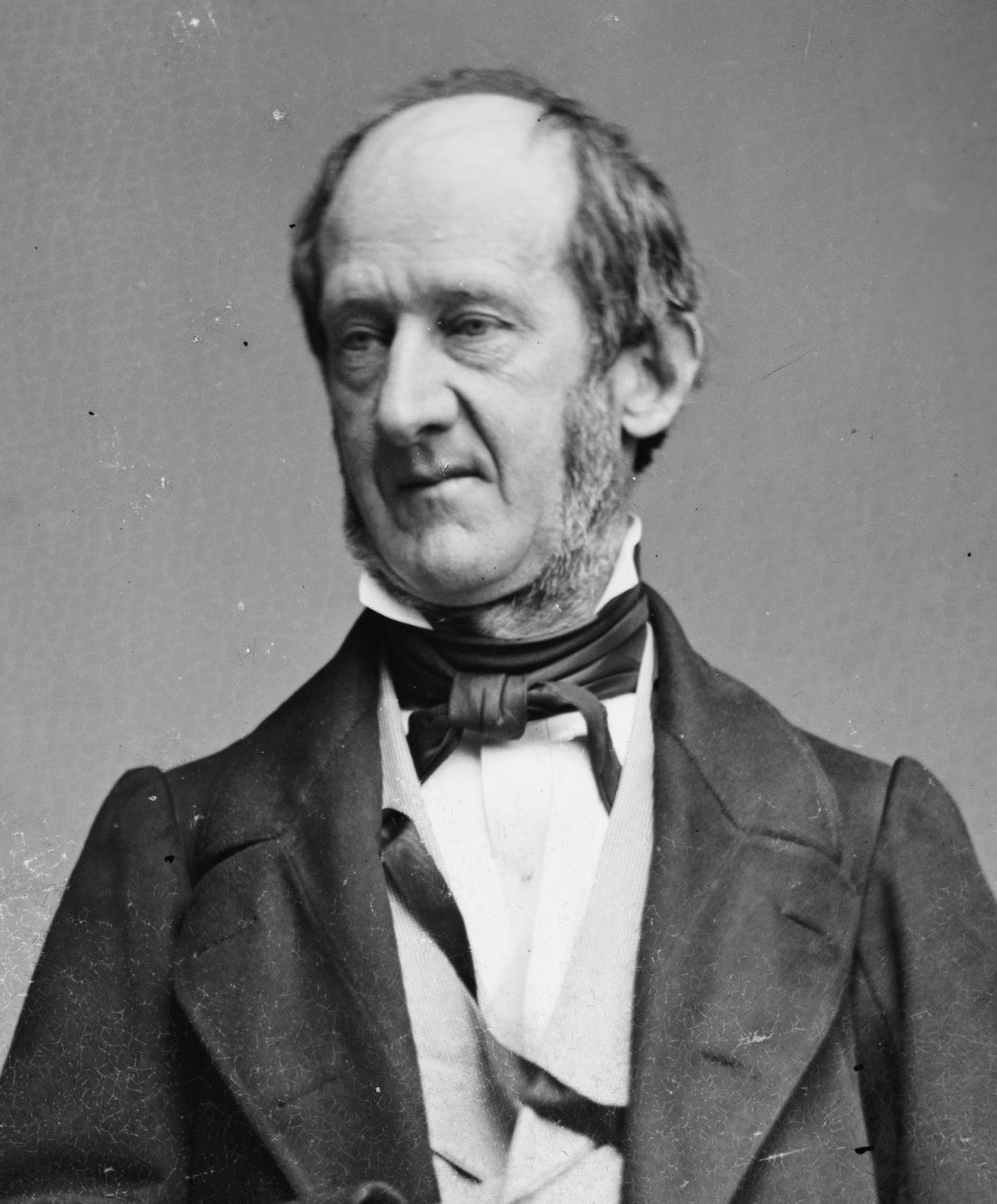
- Stanly, c. 1855–1865

Member of the U.S. House of Representatives from North Carolina's 3rd district
- In office March 4, 1837 – March 3, 1843
- Preceded by: Ebenezer Pettigrew
- Succeeded by: David S. Reid

Member of the U.S. House of Representatives from North Carolina's 8th district
- In office March 4, 1849 – March 3, 1853
- Preceded by: Richard S. Donnell
- Succeeded by: Thomas L. Clingman

Personal details
- Born: January 10, 1810 New Bern, North Carolina, U.S.
- Died: July 12, 1872 (aged 62) San Francisco, California, U.S.
- Spouse: Cornelia Baldwin (m. 1859)
- Parent: John Stanly (father)
- Relatives: Fabius Stanly (brother); Lewis Armistead (nephew)

Edward W. Stanly (January 10, 1810 – July 12, 1872) was an American lawyer and politician. He was a North Carolina politician and orator who represented the southeastern portion of the state in the United States House of Representatives for five terms. In 1857, Stanly ran for governor of California, but lost to John B. Weller. Politicians of the mid-nineteenth century remarked that Stanly bore a strong physical resemblance to William H. Seward, though this resemblance lessened over time.

== Biography ==
Stanly was born in New Bern, North Carolina, on January 10, 1810. He was a son of U.S. Representative John Stanly of New Bern and a cousin of U.S. Senator George Edmund Badger. Stanly attended New Bern Academy and graduated from the American Literary, Scientific and Military Academy, Norwich University in 1829. He then studied law and was admitted to the bar in 1832. He settled in Beaufort County and began to practice law.

Four years later, he successfully ran for a seat in the United States House of Representatives on the Whig ticket. He served in the Twenty-fifth, Twenty-sixth and Twenty-seventh congresses from March 4, 1837, to March 3, 1843. Stanly earned his reputation as North Carolina's greatest orator of his generation during his first term in Congress. Throughout his service in Congress, Stanly was a leader of the Southerners who emphasized the Union over states' rights. He won the nickname the 'Conqueror' during his re-election campaign of 1839.

After an unsuccessful bid for re-election in 1843 due to unfavorable redistricting, Stanly returned to North Carolina, where he served as a member of the House of Commons from 1844 to 1846 and again in 1848. He was speaker of the State House from 1844 to 1846, and his impartial presiding was hailed by Commoners of both parties as returning dignity to the chamber in the place of the former political rancor. Stanly served briefly as attorney general of North Carolina in 1847-1848.

In 1849, Stanly was again elected to the U.S. House, serving two terms from March 4, 1849, to March 3, 1853. He declined to run for a sixth term in the elections of 1853 and instead moved to California and practiced law in San Francisco. He was the Republican Party’s unsuccessful candidate for Governor and U.S. Senator in 1857.

He served as a general in the Union Army during the American Civil War, and he was also a slaveowner. Abraham Lincoln appointed Stanly military governor of eastern North Carolina with the rank of brigadier general on May 26, 1862. Stanly resigned this office less than a year later on March 2, 1863, in a dispute with President Lincoln over the Emancipation Proclamation.

He returned to California and resumed his law practice. He died in San Francisco on July 12, 1872. He is buried in the Stanly family plot at Mountain View Cemetery in Oakland, California.

== Personal life ==
On May 11, 1859, in San Francisco, Stanly married Cornelia Baldwin, the sister of Joseph G. Baldwin, a Virginia-born attorney who served on the California Supreme Court. She died April 13, 1903, in San Francisco.

Stanly's sister married General Walker Keith Armistead. His brother, Fabius Stanly, was a Unionist and rear admiral in the U.S. Navy. Stanly's nephew Brigadier General Lewis Armistead, fought for the Confederacy during the Civil War. Armistead led a brigade in the Confederate Army at Pickett’s Charge during the Battle of Gettysburg. Stanly and Armistead were born in the same house in New Bern, North Carolina. The home stands today.

== Sources consulted ==
- United States Congress. "Edward Stanly (id: S000799)". Biographical Directory of the United States Congress.
- NCpedia

Party political offices
First	Republican nominee for Governor of California; 1857	Succeeded by Leland Stanford
U.S. House of Representatives
Preceded by Ebenezer Pettigrew	Member of the U.S. House of Representatives from North Carolina's 3rd congressional district 1837–1843	Succeeded by David S. Reid
Preceded by Richard S. Donnell	Member of the U.S. House of Representatives from North Carolina's 8th congressional district 1849–1853	Succeeded by Thomas L. Clingman
Legal offices
Preceded by Spier Whitaker	Attorney General of North Carolina; 1848–1851	Succeeded by Bartholomew F. Moore
