= John Stanly (politician) =

American politician (1774–1834)

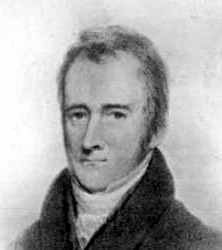

Member of the U.S. House of Representatives from North Carolina
- In office March 4, 1801 – March 3, 1803
- Preceded by: Richard Dobbs Spaight
- Succeeded by: Nathaniel Alexander
- Constituency: 10th district
- In office March 4, 1809 – March 3, 1811
- Preceded by: William Blackledge
- Succeeded by: William Blackledge
- Constituency: 4th district

Personal details
- Born: April 9, 1774 New Bern, North Carolina, U.S.
- Died: August 2, 1834 (aged 60) New Bern, North Carolina, U.S.
- Resting place: Cedar Grove Cemetery; New Bern, North Carolina, U.S.
- Party: Federalist
- Children: Edward and Fabius
- Education: Princeton University

John Stanly (April 9, 1774 – August 2, 1834) was a Federalist U.S. congressman from North Carolina between 1801 and 1803 and again between 1809 and 1811. He was the father of Edward Stanly and rear admiral Fabius Stanly, and the father-in-law of General Walker Keith Armistead.

== Early life ==
Stanly, the son of John Wright Stanly, was born in New Bern, North Carolina, and educated by private tutors before attending Princeton University. He studied law and was admitted to the bar in 1799.

== Career ==
After practicing law and serving as a clerk and master in equity, Stanly was elected to the North Carolina House of Commons in 1798 and 1799.

In 1800, Stanly was elected as a Federalist to the 7th United States Congress (March 4, 1801 – March 3, 1803); he served again in the 11th Congress (March 4, 1809 – March 3, 1811) before returning to the practice of law. Stanly returned to the state house for several more terms, in 1812–1815, 1818–1819, and 1823–1825. He died in New Bern in 1834 and is buried in the Cedar Grove Cemetery. He is also known for killing Richard Dobbs Spaight, a signer of the Constitution, in a famous duel in 1802. Although Spaight's family sought to have Stanly charged with murder, he was pardoned by Gov. Benjamin Williams. As a result of the duel, North Carolina passed a strict anti-duelling law prohibiting duelists from holding public office, and listing the duel as a specific crime, as opposed to a common law offense.

== Personal life ==
Stanly had at least three sons: Edward, Fabius and Marcus Cicero. His daughter married General Walker Keith Armistead.

== Legacy ==
Stanly County, North Carolina was formed in 1841, and named in his honor.

Research by Chris Bramlett indicates that John Stanly had no connection with the area named for him, but that the name was chosen to please state legislators. Bramlett also believed that Stanly's father John Wright Stanly, named him Stanley and changed the spelling. One theory offered by Bramlett is that the elder Stanly, while on a trip to India during the American Revolution, met a British soldier named Stanley. Since he did not like the idea of being related to a British soldier, Stanly said his name was spelled without an E.

U.S. House of Representatives
Preceded by Richard Spaight	Member of the U.S. House of Representatives from North Carolina's 10th congressional district 1801–1803	Succeeded by Nathaniel Alexander
Preceded by William Blackledge	Member of the U.S. House of Representatives from North Carolina's 4th congressional district 1809–1811	Succeeded by William Blackledge
