= USS Victoria (1855) =

Gunboat of the United States Navy

History

United States
- Launched: 1855
- Acquired: 26 December 1861
- Commissioned: 13 March 1862
- Decommissioned: 4 May 1865
- Fate: Sold, 30 November 1865

General characteristics
- Displacement: 254 tons
- Length: 113 ft (34 m)
- Beam: 22 ft (6.7 m)
- Depth of hold: 10 ft 6 in (3.20 m)
- Propulsion: steam engine; screw-propelled
- Speed: 12 knots (22 km/h; 14 mph)
- Armament: one 30-pounder Parrott rifle; two 8" smoothbore guns

USS Victoria was a steamer acquired by the Union Navy during the American Civil War.

Victoria was used by the Union Navy as a gunboat in support of the Union Navy blockade of Confederate waterways.

== Service history ==
Victoria—a wooden steamer built at Kensington, Pennsylvania, in 1855—was purchased by the Union Navy at New York City on 26 December 1861 for blockade duty during the Civil War; and was commissioned at the New York Navy Yard on 13 March 1862, Lt. Comdr. George A. Stevens in command. Upon her commissioning, Victoria was assigned to Rear Admiral Louis M. Goldsborough's North Atlantic Blockading Squadron and left New York, bound for Hampton Roads, Virginia, on 17 March 1862. She arrived there on the 20th, reconnoitered the mouth of the Rappahannock River, Virginia, from the 25th to the 31st, and towed the gunboat Chocura to the Baltimore, Maryland, Navy Yard, on 2 April. She returned to Hampton Roads on the 4th but, on the 17th, was ordered to join the blockade off Wilmington, North Carolina.

Victoria operated exclusively in the coastal waters, sounds, rivers, and inlets of North Carolina during the remainder of her active naval career. In company with other Union blockaders, she compiled an impressive list of prizes but often failed to capture sighted blockade runners because of her greatly inferior speed and generally poor condition. The first successful capture was the steamer Nassau and her cargo of Enfield rifles and ammunition, seized by Victoria and USS State of Georgia off Confederate Fort Caswell, North Carolina, on 28 May. Also off Fort Caswell, Victoria, USS Mount Vernon, and USS Mystic chased aground and destroyed the blockade runner Emily standing in for Wilmington on 26 June. Victoria sailed for Beaufort, North Carolina, for repairs on 30 August, returned to the blockade off New Inlet, North Carolina, on 4 September, and put into the Norfolk Navy Yard, Virginia, for more extensive repairs on the 21st.

Repairs completed, Victoria left Norfolk, Virginia, on 8 December, arriving at her old duty station off Wilmington on the 9th. She immediately resumed her routine patrol and reconnaissance activities and, on 25 December, prevented an unidentified blockade-running steamer from landing ashore below the Cape Fear River, North Carolina. On 28 December, she chased a large steamer near Little River, North Carolina, and landed a small reconnaissance party near the mouth of the river on the 31st. Victoria captured the brig Minna and her cargo of salt and drugs near Shallote Inlet, North Carolina, on 18 February 1863. After another unsuccessful pursuit of a blockade runner on the night of the 24th, USS William Bacon and Victoria seized the blockade-running British steamer Nicolai I off Cape Fear, North Carolina, on 21 March.

During the remainder of the year, Victoria's already fragile structural condition steadily deteriorated, prompting her disgruntled captain to complain in August that the vessel was unfit to remain with the blockade off Wilmington. Nevertheless, she continued on station and, after several more unsuccessful pursuits of blockade running steamers, finally put into the Norfolk Navy Yard for temporary repairs in early October. After a brief return to duty later in the month, at which time she captured a small sloop off Little River on the 15th, Victoria entered the Norfolk Navy Yard for a major overhaul in November. These latest repairs took almost six months to complete, and Victoria did not leave the navy yard for the Wilmington blockade until late April 1864. Once there, she fired upon, chased aground, and destroyed the blockade-running steamer Georgiana McCaw near Wilmington on 2 June 1864.

However, the gunboat again began to deteriorate soon thereafter and spent most of the remainder of the year in hopeless, frustrating pursuits of blockade runners. Victoria was damaged further in a collision with the steamer USS Cherokee that summer and eventually returned to the Norfolk Navy Yard for a new round of repairs in December. Victoria remained at Norfolk for the duration of the war, where she was decommissioned on 4 May 1865. She was sold at auction at New York City to L. A. Edwards on 30 November; redocumented on 13 June 1866; and dropped from documentation in 1871.
