= USS William Bacon =

Gunboat of the United States Navy

History

United States
- Acquired: 6 September 1861
- Commissioned: 3 February 1862
- Decommissioned: 17 June 1865
- Fate: Sold, 20 July 1865

General characteristics
- Displacement: 183 tons
- Length: 95 ft (29 m)
- Beam: 26 ft (7.9 m)
- Draft: 8 ft 10 in (2.69 m)
- Depth of hold: 8 ft 3 in (2.51 m)
- Propulsion: schooner sail
- Armament: 1 × 13 in (330 mm) mortar; 2 × 32-pounder guns

USS William Bacon was a schooner acquired by the Union Navy during the American Civil War. She was used by the Union Navy as a gunboat in support of the Union Navy blockade of Confederate waterways.

== Service history ==
William Bacon—a wooden-hulled schooner—was purchased by the Union Navy on 6 September 1861 from Van Brunt and Slaight and commissioned at the New York Navy Yard, Brooklyn, New York, on 3 February 1862, Acting Master William P. Rogers, USN, in command. Assigned to the mortar flotilla attached to Flag Officer David Glasgow Farragut's West Gulf Blockading Squadron, William Bacon departed New York City under tow on 6 February and arrived at Key West, Florida, on 18 February. The next day, she shifted to Pilot Town. Flag Officer Farragut gathered his forces at the mouth of the Mississippi River to commence one phase of the move designed to split the Confederacy asunder along that major waterway. Defending the mouth of that key artery were Forts Jackson and St. Philip, mounting between them 115 guns, in addition to a heavy barrier of chained hulks and logs that lay in the river below the forts to obstruct the passage.

The steamer USS Westfield took William Bacon under tow on the morning of 11 April and, at 0915, headed upriver; at 1300, the crew on board the mortar schooner began dressing the masts with green bushes in an attempt to camouflage the ship—a standard practice throughout the flotilla as it began to clear for action with the Confederate forces upstream. William Bacon and the other ships of the mortar flotilla kept up a steady, heavy fire on the two Confederate forts over the next week. Farragut's squadron, meanwhile, battered their way through the barrier and successfully made passage. Three days later, the forts—heavily battered by the shells from the mortar flotilla and surrounded on the landward sides by the Army's expeditionary forces under General Benjamin Franklin Butler—surrendered, thus removing a formidable barrier to the Federal operations. William Bacon, her task in the reduction of the forts completed, dropped down the river to Southwest Pass, where she awaited further orders.

Because of the enervating climate, however, William Bacon did not tarry long at the mouth of the Mississippi River. She sailed for Hampton Roads, Virginia, soon thereafter and refitted there into the summer. Briefly assigned to the Potomac Flotilla, William Bacon subsequently received orders on 11 December 1862 to report for duty with the North Atlantic Blockading Squadron off Wilmington, North Carolina. Three days later, she began taking on stores at Hampton Roads for delivery to the ships already off Wilmington and apparently arrived later in the month to take up her duties. Extant records indicate that the blockade had been strengthened with additional ships by 29 December -- William Bacon included. William Bacon operated primarily off Wilmington and the sounds of North Carolina into 1863. Relieving USS Matthew Vassar at Little River Inlet on 13 March 1863, she was receiving fresh water from the steamer USS Victoria on 21 March, off the mouth of the Little River, when lookouts sighted a sail to the westward at about 0900. Victoria, Acting Volunteer Lieutenant Edward Hooker commanding, immediately got up steam and gave chase. In accordance with orders from Hooker, William Bacon slipped her anchor chain and made sail.

Victoria, the faster of the two Union vessels, managed to close the range in the fog and mist prevailing offshore that morning and lobbed a few shots at the stranger, all of which fell close aboard. While William Bacon came up rapidly, the unidentified vessel hove around and stood toward the two blockaders; Acting Master Rogers, commanding William Bacon, later reported "and as we did not know but what there might be some resistance, every man was at the gun ready for immediate action." While William Bacon thus stood by in a posture of readiness, Victoria lowered a boat. Soon, the blockaders learned the identity of the strange ship: she was the English steamer Nicolai I, bound from Nassau, New Providence, in the Bahamas, for Charleston, South Carolina, with a cargo of dry goods, arms, and ammunition. Victoria consequently took her prize into custody and took her up to the main body of the fleet. William Bacon soon returned to the drudgery of coastal patrols. Records are not clear as to what the ship did next, but it may be presumed that she served in a support capacity for the duration of the Civil War. Ultimately decommissioned at the Washington Navy Yard on 17 June 1865, William Bacon was sold at auction to William L. Wall and Co., on 20 July of the same year.

== Bibliography ==
- Silverstone, Paul H. (2006). Civil War Navies 1855–1883. The U.S. Navy Warship Series. New York: Routledge. ISBN 978-0-415-97870-5.
