= USS Stanly =

Fletcher-class destroyer

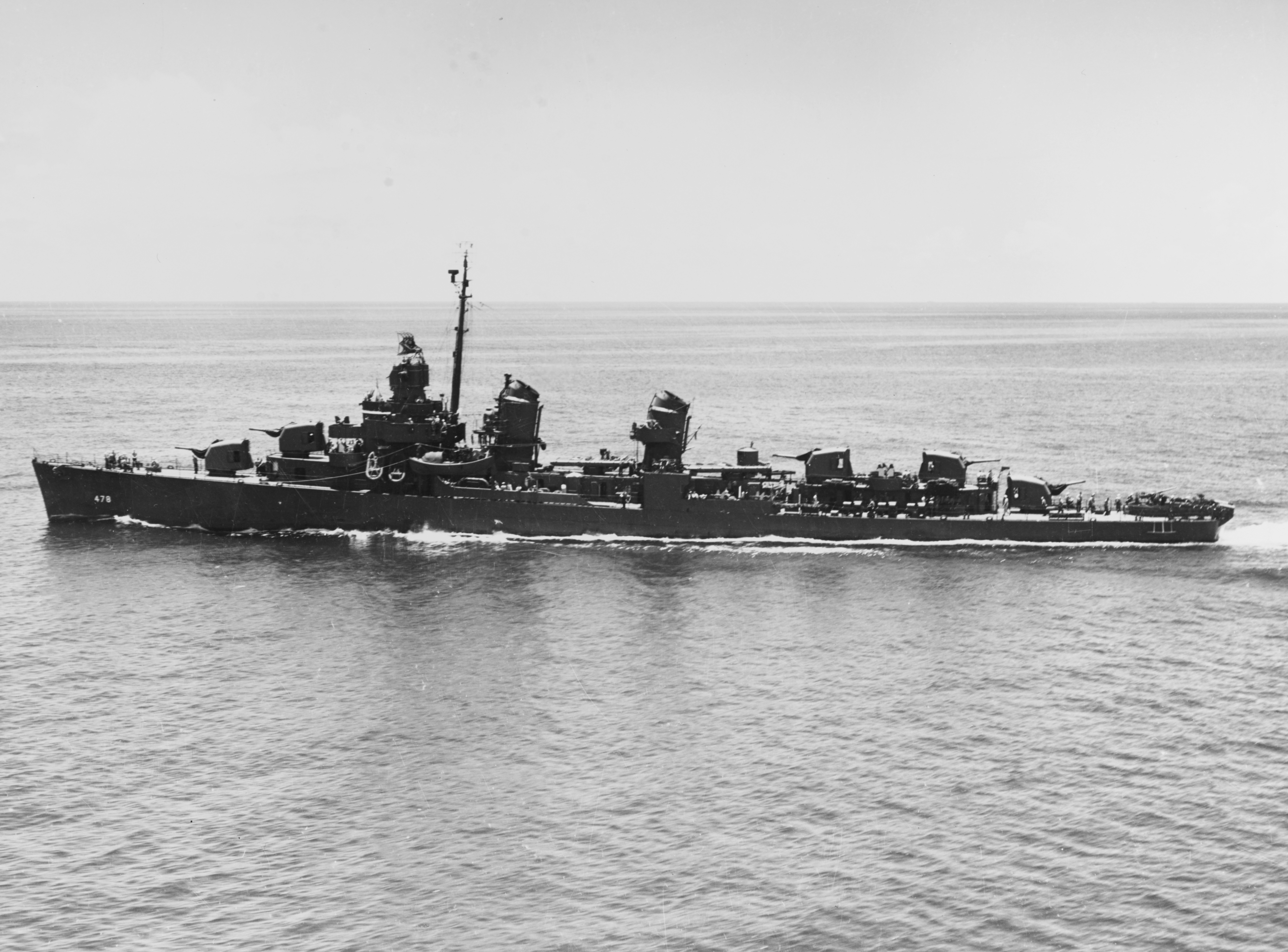

History

United States
- Namesake: Fabius Stanly/Fabius Stenly
- Builder: Charleston Navy Yard
- Laid down: 15 September 1941
- Launched: 2 May 1942
- Commissioned: 15 October 1942
- Decommissioned: 15 January 1947
- Stricken: 1 December 1970
- Fate: Sold for scrap, 1972

General characteristics
- Class & type: Fletcher-class destroyer
- Displacement: 2,050 tons
- Length: 376 ft 6 in (114.7 m)
- Beam: 39 ft 8 in (12.1 m)
- Draft: 17 ft 9 in (5.4 m)
- Propulsion: 60,000 shp (45 MW); 2 propellers
- Speed: 35 knots (65 km/h; 40 mph)
- Range: 6500 nmi. (12,000 km) at 15 kt
- Complement: 329
- Armament: 5 × single Mk 12 5 in (127 mm)/38 guns; 5 × twin 40 mm (1.6 in) Bofors AA guns; 7 × single 20 mm (0.8 in) Oerlikon AA guns; 2 × quintuple 21 in (533 mm) torpedo tubes; 6 × single depth charge throwers; 2 × depth charge racks

USS Stanly (DD-478) was a Fletcher-class destroyer in service with the United States Navy from 1942 to 1947. She was scrapped in 1972.

== History ==
USS Stanly (DD-478) was named for Rear Admiral Fabius Stanly (1815–1882). She was laid down on 15 September 1941 at the Charleston Navy Yard; launched on 2 May 1942; sponsored by Mrs. Elizabeth Stanley Boss; and commissioned on 15 October 1942. John F. Kennedy, future U.S. president, was in attendance of this ceremony.

=== 1943 ===
Stanly remained at the Charleston Navy Yard fitting-out and undergoing dock trials until 30 December. During that time, her seaplane catapult was removed to make room for additional 5-inch guns. On the 30th, she passed Fort Sumter on her way to shakedown training off the coast of Cuba. Stanly returned to Charleston on 7 January 1943 and operated on the east coast and in Guantanamo Bay until 28 February when she rounded Cape Charles and headed for Delaware Bay, where she joined Santa Fe (CL-60) and sailed with the light cruiser for Panama.

The two warships transited the Panama Canal on 5 March, fueled at Balboa the next day, and steamed for Long Beach. They stayed at San Pedro Harbor from the 12th to the 16th, when they headed for Hawaii. After entering Pearl Harbor on 22 March, Stanly operated out of that naval base until May, hunting submarines, participating in drills, and screening convoys on the last leg of their voyages to Oahu. Finally, on 14 May, she departed Pearl Harbor in the screen of a westward-bound convoy. Twelve days later, Stanly and her convoy passed through the submarine nets into the harbor at Nouméa, New Caledonia.

Over the next three months, Stanly was in and out of Nouméa, escorting convoys and screening battleships and aircraft carriers. She made trips as far west as the coast of Australia and as far north and east as the New Hebrides and Wallis islands. Upon her return to Nouméa from Wallis Island on 7 August, Stanly was ordered to Espiritu Santo with a convoy. Entering Segond Channel on the 11th, she underwent 13 days availability before exiting the channel for Fila Island, also in the New Hebrides. On this passage, she was accompanied by destroyers Charles Ausburne (DD-570), Claxton (DD-571), and Dyson (DD-572). The four destroyers arrived at Fila on the 24th and stood out again the next day, bound for the Solomons.

By 27 August, Stanly and the other three destroyers were off Guadalcanal, patrolling the anchorage at Lengo Channel. The Solomons-Bismarcks area was to be her theater of operations until late February 1944. On 28 August, she stopped at Tulagi; then, steamed on to patrol the entrance to Kula Gulf, between Kolombangara and New Georgia, and returned the next day to Port Purvis on Florida Island. During the first week in September, Stanly sailed between Port Purvis and Tulagi; then, on the 8th, escorted a convoy out of Purvis Bay. The destroyer parted company with the convoy on 10 September and headed on to New Caledonia. Arriving in Nouméa on the 13th, she underwent boiler repairs, exchanged ammunition and torpedoes, fueled, and departed on 29 September.

She escorted another convoy from New Caledonia to Guadalcanal in October, leaving it off Lunga Point on the 5th. After stopping at Espiritu Santo on 8 October, Stanly returned to Post Purvis to fuel and pick up another convoy. For the rest of October, she continued to guard the convoys from Florida Island to various islands in the Solomons. On the last day of the month, she stood out of Purvis Bay and joined Task Force 39 (TF 39). During the following evening and night, Stanly fought off an attack by Japanese motor torpedo boats while the task force pounded Buka Island. The Japanese lost at least three boats during the action. Later that night, Stanly joined the rest of the task force in shelling the Shortlands, located just off the southern tip of Bougainville, in support of the landings farther north at Empress Augusta Bay.

Late on 1 November, TF 39 sighted an enemy surface force, but was unable to engage it until early the next morning when it sallied forth to harass the landing area at Empress Augusta Bay. Radar contact was made at 02:30 on 2 November; and Stanly, along with the other three destroyers in the van, opened the battle with a torpedo attack. Though the cruisers of Rear Admiral Aaron S. Merrill's TF 39 were the star of the ensuing battle, Capt. Arleigh Burke's "Little Beavers", Stanly included, contributed by finishing off the destroyer Hatsukaze and by showering a hail of 5 inch shells on the enemy. The Battle of Empress Augusta Bay claimed one enemy cruiser, Sendai, and the destroyer already mentioned, but, more importantly. Admiral Sentaro Omori retired northward without accomplishing his mission, the landing of reinforcements at Cape Torokina. As dawn broke, the American warships steamed off toward a rendezvous with some transports. On the way, TF 39 beat off a 100-plane raid from Rabaul and, by the next day, was in port in Tulagi.

Throughout November and December 1943, Stanly operated between the New Hebrides, the Solomons, and among the various islands of the latter group. On 16 November, she joined Converse (DD-509) in shelling a Japanese submarine and, in all probability, sank it. At various times during this period, she came under aerial attack; on Christmas Eve she bombarded Massungon Island. Stanly put in at Port Purvis on the day after Christmas for logistics and, eight days later, departed for Espiritu Santo and availability and exercises.

=== 1944 ===
On 29 January 1944, she completed underway exercises and reentered Port Purvis. She stood out again the next day; patrolled around Buka Island, Choiseul Bay, Bougainville, and Green Island; and bombarded the west coast of Bougainville, the east coast of Buka, and the east coast of Bougainville, before retiring to Florida Island. Stanly entered Purvis Bay on 11 February and departed again on the 13th. She feinted toward Espiritu Santo; then, under the cover of darkness, turned north and headed for Green Island, where she supported the landings on 14 and 15 February.

By the 22nd, she was cruising the Kavieng-New Hanover area of the "Bismarcks Barrier". On that day, she sank a seagoing tug and helped sink the small minelayer Nasami. For the next month, Stanly continued to operate with TF 39, conducting antishipping sweeps of the Kavieng-Rabaul sea lanes and bombarding various enemy positions in the Bismarcks. She also returned periodically to escort supply echelons among the several islands in the Solomons group.

As the emphasis shifted from the South Pacific to the Central Pacific in early 1944, so too, did the need for destroyers. On 24 March, Stanly exited Purvis Bay and, by the 30th, was cruising in the screen of Vice Admiral Marc A. Mitscher's Fast Carrier Task Force (then-called TF 58) as it launched planes against the Palau Islands. On the next day, she sailed north of Palau as Task Group 58.4 (TG 58.4) sent strikes against both Palau and Yap. The carriers' planes hit Woleai on 1 April and began retiring to Majuro. Stanly arrived in Majuro lagoon on the 6th and underwent repairs until the 30th. She spent the month of May in operations and exercises around Majuro. From 3 to 8 June, in company with Indianapolis (CA-35), the destroyer made the circuit from Majuro to Kwajalein to Eniwetok, leaving the latter atoll on the 8th to rejoin TF 58.

The Fast Carrier Task Force, with Stanly in its screen, opened the air assault on the Marianas on 11 June, sending sorties to bomb and strafe Guam, Rota, Tinian, and Saipan. The pilots of TF 58 added Pagan Island to their itinerary on the 12th and again on the 13th. On 15 and 16 June, Stanly escorted Task Group 58.4 while its planes attacked Iwo Jima and Chi Chi Jima in the Bonins. On the 18th, the task group rejoined TF 58 just in time to witness the Battle of the Philippine Sea, in which the United States Navy broke Japanese naval airpower. On 20 June, Stanly participated in the bombardment of Guam and Rota and, two days later, moved off to defend and support the American forces on Saipan. She continued patrols and periodic bombardments around Saipan until 3 July, when she retired with TG 58.4 to Eniwetok. The destroyer returned to the Marianas on 18 July and screened the carriers until the 31st, when she was ordered back to the United States.

Stopping at Eniwetok from 1 to 3 August and at Pearl Harbor overnight on 10 and 11 August, Stanly entered the Bethlehem Steel Co. shipyard at San Francisco on the 17th. She spent the month of September in overhaul and early October in trials. By 18 October, she was back in Pearl Harbor preparing to return to the western Pacific. Finally, on 10 November, she stood out of Pearl Harbor and, 11 days later, entered Ulithi lagoon. Stanly remained in Ulithi for the rest of November and for the first week in December. On 8 December, she escorted Boulder Victory (AK-227) and SS Elmira Victory to Kossol Passage in the Palaus.

After fueling, she sailed for the Philippines and arrived in Leyte Gulf on 11 December. The destroyer operated out of San Pedro Bay for the remainder of 1944.

=== 1945 ===
Stanly, in company with Charles Ausburne (DD-570), Foote (DD-511), Converse (DD-509), and Sterett (DD-407), sortied from San Pedro Bay on 4 January 1945 and escorted the landing forces to the San Fabian and Lingayen areas of northern Luzon. Until the 27th, she patrolled the transport areas and stood radar picket duty for the assault forces while the Japanese launched the first major kamikaze onslaught of the war. By 31 January, she was back off Leyte and, four days later, entered Ulithi. On 8 February, she stood out for Saipan and arrived on the 10th. Stanly patrolled off Saipan for six days; then off Iwo Jima from 16 February until 13 March. She returned to Saipan for logistics on 15 March and weighed anchor on the 17th. She put in at Ulithi the next day and stayed until 27 March, undergoing repairs. At the completion of repairs, she headed for Okinawa, where she arrived late on the 31st.

For the first 11 days of April, Stanly moved from station to station around Okinawa on radar picket duty. On the 12th, as the "Divine Wind" again rose to gale force, she was on station north of the island. Cassin Young (DD-793) had just been crashed by a kamikaze, and Stanly was speeding to her station. Soon enemy planes were swarming around her like angry bees, and she maneuvered radically to avoid their deadly sting. In the meantime, Stanly's fighter director team took charge of the stricken destroyer's combat air patrol. Under their direction, the friendly fighters whittled away at the attackers, splashing six Aichi D3A "Val" naval dive bombers in rapid succession.

American fighters and kamikazes swirled above Stanly in a grand melee. Suddenly, out of the maelstrom of planes, a rocket-powered Yokosuka MXY-7 Ohka piloted flying bomb plunged toward her at a speed in excess of 500 knots (900 km/h). Her assailant's great speed made countermeasures impossible; and so, Stanly absorbed the kamikaze's impact on the starboard side of her bow, five feet above the waterline. The warhead punched clear through the hull of Stanly without detonating, passed out her port side, and exploded in the water close aboard. The remains of the pilot and some wreckage were later recovered from inside the vessel. Within minutes of the first attack, another Ohka headed for the ship, with the destroyer's antiaircraft guns blazing on it. The pilot was either wounded or killed, as at the last moment, the Ohka whisked over the ship and snatched her ensign from its gaff in passing. It skipped across the water like a flat stone, then disintegrated.

Soon after the second Ohka's pass, Stanly was ordered to close the transports at Hagushi. On her way, she experienced her third near-fatal encounter of the day when a Mitsubishi Zero "Zeke" tried to bomb and crash into her in a single pass. Stanly's luck held as the bomb fell short and the plane overshot. Miraculously, her total casualties for all the day's action amounted to only three wounded sailors. Late that night, she entered "Busted Ship Bay" at Kerama Retto for repairs.

After 10 days at Kerama, she returned to Okinawa for an anticlimactic period of radar picket duty. She departed with an Ulithi-bound convoy on 5 May and arrived in the lagoon four days later. The destroyer underwent further repairs and exited the lagoon on the 28th for gunnery exercises. During these drills, the barrel blew off her number 5 gun, killing two coxswains. Ironically, Stanly's only mortal casualties of the war occurred during training.

The destroyer moved on to Apra Harbor, Guam, to repair the damaged gun mount. She arrived on 3 June and remained for over two and one-half months undergoing extended availability. She was still there when hostilities ended on 15 August.

On the 20th, Stanly weighed anchor, stopped at Eniwetok and at Pearl Harbor, and entered Mare Island Naval Shipyard on the 30th. On 22 September, while still undergoing overhaul, Stanly was assigned to the Pacific Reserve Fleet.

At the completion of overhaul, she steamed down the coast to San Diego to enter the Reserve Fleet, still in commission.

=== Post-war ===
Stanly was decommissioned in October 1946 and shifted her berth to Long Beach, California (USA), in January 1947. She remained in the Pacific Reserve Fleet until 1 December 1970 when her name was struck from the Navy list. Her hulk was sold in February 1972 to Chou's Iron & Steel Co., Ltd., for scrapping.

== Awards ==
Stanly earned nine battle stars for her World War II service, and the Presidential Unit Citation (US) as part of DesRon 23 the "Little Beavers", for its "extraordinary heroism in action against enemy Japanese forces during the Solomon Islands Campaign, from 1 November 1943, to 23 February 1944"—the only destroyer squadron so honored. Some live footage of her appears in the 1949 film Sands of Iwo Jima at 1hr 23min.
