= 1857 California gubernatorial election =

- September 2, 1857
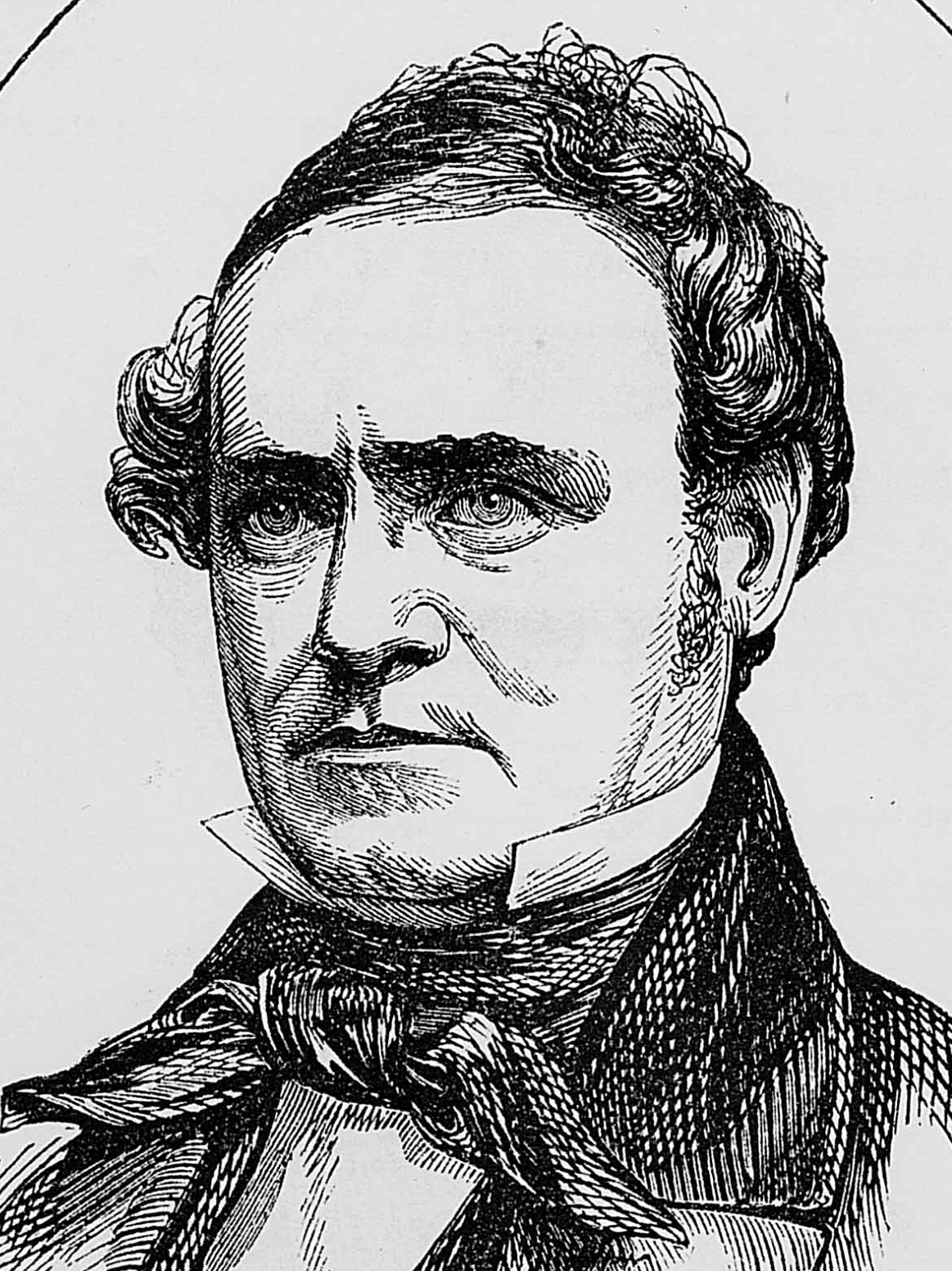

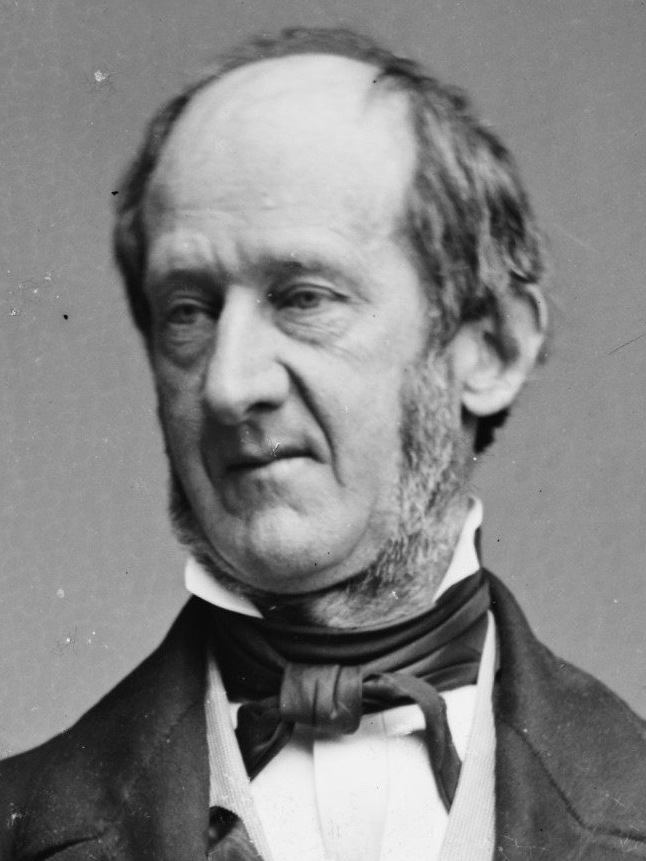

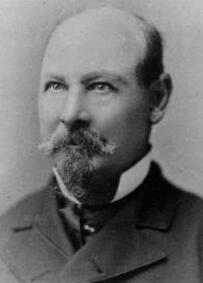
Nominee	John B. Weller	Edward Stanly	George Washington Bowie
Party	Democratic	Republican	Know Nothing
Popular vote	53,122	21,040	19,481
Percentage	56.71%	22.46%	20.80%
- County results Weller: 30–40% 40–50% 50–60% 60–70% 70–80% 80–90% >90% Stanly: 50–60% Bowie: 50–60% Unknown
Governor before election
J. Neely Johnson
Know Nothing
Elected Governor
John B. Weller
Democratic

The 1857 California gubernatorial election was held on September 2, 1857, to elect the governor of California.

== Results ==
California gubernatorial election, 1857
Party	Candidate	Votes	%	±%
Democratic	John B. Weller	53,122	56.71%	+9.26%
Republican	Edward Stanly	21,040	22.46%	+22.46%
Know Nothing	George Washington Bowie	19,481	20.80%	−31.73%
	Scattering	29	0.03%	+0.01%
Majority		32,082	34.25%	
Total votes		93,672	100.00%	
Democratic gain from Know Nothing		Swing	+39.32%	

=== Results by county ===
County	John B. Weller Democratic		Edward Stanly Republican		George W. Bowie Know Nothing		Scattering Write-in		Margin		Total votes cast
County	#	%	#	%	#	%	#	%	#	%	Total votes cast
Alameda	784	44.90%	945	54.12%	14	0.80%	3	0.17%	-161	-9.22%	1,746
Amador	1,619	52.09%	492	15.83%	997	32.08%	0	0.00%	622 (Note: Margin over Bowie)	20.01%	3,108
Butte	2,341	55.19%	1,043	24.59%	853	20.11%	5	0.12%	1,298	30.60%	4,242
Calaveras	2,603	68.57%	505	13.30%	688	18.12%	0	0.00%	1,915	50.45%	3,796
Colusa	321	59.89%	37	6.90%	178	33.21%	0	0.00%	143	26.68%	536
Contra Costa	532	60.80%	270	30.86%	73	8.34%	0	0.00%	262	29.94%	875
Del Norte	310	70.62%	67	15.26%	64	14.12%	0	0.00%	243	55.35%	439
El Dorado	3,129	50.80%	1,337	21.70%	1,693	27.48%	1	0.02%	1,436	23.31%	6,160
Fresno	276	99.64%	1	0.36%	0	0.00%	0	0.00%	275	99.28%	277
Humboldt	366	67.28%	178	32.72%	0	0.00%	0	0.00%	188	34.56%	544
Klamath	485	85.54%	22	3.88%	60	10.58%	0	0.00%	425	74.96%	567
Los Angeles	1,304	93.08%	82	5.85%	15	1.07%	0	0.00%	1,222	87.22%	1,401
Marin	444	70.03%	188	29.65%	2	0.32%	0	0.00%	256	40.38%	634
Mariposa	1,217	67.24%	152	8.40%	441	24.36%	0	0.00%	776	42.87%	1,810
Merced	257	90.18%	9	3.16%	19	6.67%	0	0.00%	238	83.51%	285
Monterey	509	82.10%	91	14.68%	20	3.23%	0	0.00%	418	67.42%	620
Napa	765	75.97%	224	22.24%	18	1.79%	0	0.00%	541	53.72%	1,007
Nevada	2,956	53.33%	967	17.45%	1,606	28.97%	14	0.25%	1,350	24.36%	5,543
Placer	1,978	48.04%	715	17.37%	1,424	34.59%	0	0.00%	554	13.46%	4,117
Plumas	1,460	77.04%	199	10.50%	236	12.45%	0	0.00%	1,224	64.59%	1,895
Sacramento	2,518	39.00%	1,844	28.56%	2,092	32.40%	2	0.03%	426	6.60%	6,456
San Bernardino	414	98.34%	7	1.66%	0	0.00%	0	0.00%	407	96.67%	421
San Diego	207	99.52%	1	0.48%	0	0.00%	0	0.00%	206	99.04%	208
San Francisco	4,430	42.90%	5,535	53.60%	361	3.50%	1	0.01%	-1,105	-10.70%	10,327
San Joaquin	1,549	60.86%	394	15.48%	602	23.65%	0	0.00%	947	37.21%	2,545
San Luis Obispo	225	80.36%	55	19.64%	0	0.00%	0	0.00%	170	60.71%	280
San Mateo	229	54.65%	190	45.35%	0	0.00%	0	0.00%	39	9.31%	419
Santa Barbara	469	98.95%	3	0.63%	2	0.42%	0	0.00%	466	98.31%	474
Santa Clara	1,298	58.26%	891	39.99%	37	1.66%	2	0.09%	407	18.27%	2,228
Santa Cruz	450	57.54%	265	33.89%	67	8.57%	0	0.00%	185	23.66%	782
Shasta	1,406	62.91%	109	4.88%	720	32.21%	0	0.00%	686	30.69%	2,235
Sierra	2,555	52.81%	473	9.78%	1,810	37.41%	0	0.00%	745	15.40%	4,838
Siskiyou	2,425	61.11%	331	8.34%	1,212	30.54%	0	0.00%	1,213	30.57%	3,968
Solano	923	61.17%	329	21.80%	257	17.03%	0	0.00%	594	39.36%	1,509
Sonoma	1,742	68.99%	521	20.63%	262	10.38%	0	0.00%	1,221	48.36%	2,525
Stanislaus	419	75.22%	8	1.44%	130	23.34%	0	0.00%	289	51.89%	557
Sutter	550	66.43%	181	21.86%	97	11.71%	0	0.00%	369	44.57%	828
Tehama	563	67.91%	41	4.95%	225	27.14%	0	0.00%	338	40.77%	829
Trinity	901	52.14%	118	6.83%	709	41.03%	0	0.00%	192	11.11%	1,728
Tulare	404	93.74%	23	5.34%	4	0.93%	0	0.00%	381	88.40%	431
Tuolumne	3,133	56.92%	1,307	23.75%	1,064	19.33%	0	0.00%	1,826	33.18%	5,504
Yolo	521	46.77%	173	15.53%	419	37.61%	1	0.09%	102	9.16%	1,114
Yuba	2,135	55.25%	717	18.56%	1,012	26.19%	0	0.00%	1,123	29.06%	3,864
Total	53,122	56.71%	21,040	22.46%	19,481	20.80%	29	0.03%	32,082	34.25%	93,672

==== Counties that flipped from Know Nothing to Democratic ====
- Amador
- Butte
- Colusa
- El Dorado
- Humboldt
- Klamath
- Mariposa
- Merced
- Monterey
- Napa
- Nevada
- Placer
- Plumas
- Sacramento
- San Joaquin
- Santa Clara
- Santa Cruz
- Shasta
- Sierra
- Siskiyou
- Solano
- Trinity
- Tuolumne
- Yolo
- Yuba

==== Counties that flipped from Democratic to Republican ====
- Alameda
- San Francisco
