= William Blackledge =

American politician

Member of the U.S. House of Representatives from North Carolina's 4th district
- In office March 4, 1811 – March 3, 1813
- Preceded by: John Stanly
- Succeeded by: William Gaston
- In office March 4, 1803 – March 3, 1809
- Preceded by: Richard Stanford
- Succeeded by: John Stanly

Member of the North Carolina House of Commons from Craven County
- In office November 20, 1809 – December 23, 1809 Serving with John S. Nelson
- Preceded by: Stephen Harris
- Succeeded by: Vine Allen
- In office November 20, 1797 – December 23, 1799 Serving with Henry Tillman and Philip Neale
- Preceded by: William Bryan; John S. West
- Succeeded by: James Gatling; John S. Nelson

Personal details
- Born: 1767 Craven County, North Carolina, U.S.
- Died: October 19, 1828 (aged 61) Spring Hill, North Carolina, U.S.
- Party: Democratic-Republican
- Spouses: Alice Wharton (m. 1792; died 1809) Winifred Bryan Whitfield (née Bryan) (m. 1819; died 1828)
- Children: William Salter Blackledge

William Blackledge (c. 1767 – October 19, 1828) was a Democratic-Republican U.S. Congressman from North Carolina between 1803 and 1809 and between 1811 and 1813.

Born in Craven County, North Carolina, Blackledge was a member of the North Carolina House of Commons from 1797 to 1799 before being elected to the 8th United States Congress in 1802. He served three consecutive terms, during which he was one of the House managers for the impeachment of John Pickering. He ran unsuccessfully for re-election in 1808, but served briefly in the state house in 1809 and returned to serve one more term in the 12th United States Congress from 1811 to 1813. He ran for Congress unsuccessfully one final time before retiring from politics.

He owned a thousand acres of land and six slaves.

Blackledge died in Spring Hill, North Carolina in 1828. He was also the father of William Salter Blackledge, who served one term in the 17th United States Congress in the 1820s. His second wife was Winifred Bryan Whitfield (née Bryan), a daughter of Nathan Bryan. She died shortly after his death in 1828.

U.S. House of Representatives
Preceded by Richard Stanford	Member of the U.S. House of Representatives from North Carolina's 4th congressional district 1803–1809	Succeeded by John Stanly
Preceded by John Stanly	Member of the U.S. House of Representatives from North Carolina's 4th congressional district 1811–1813	Succeeded by William Gaston
