= 1857 United States Senate election in California =

- January 10, 1857

Majority vote of both houses needed to win
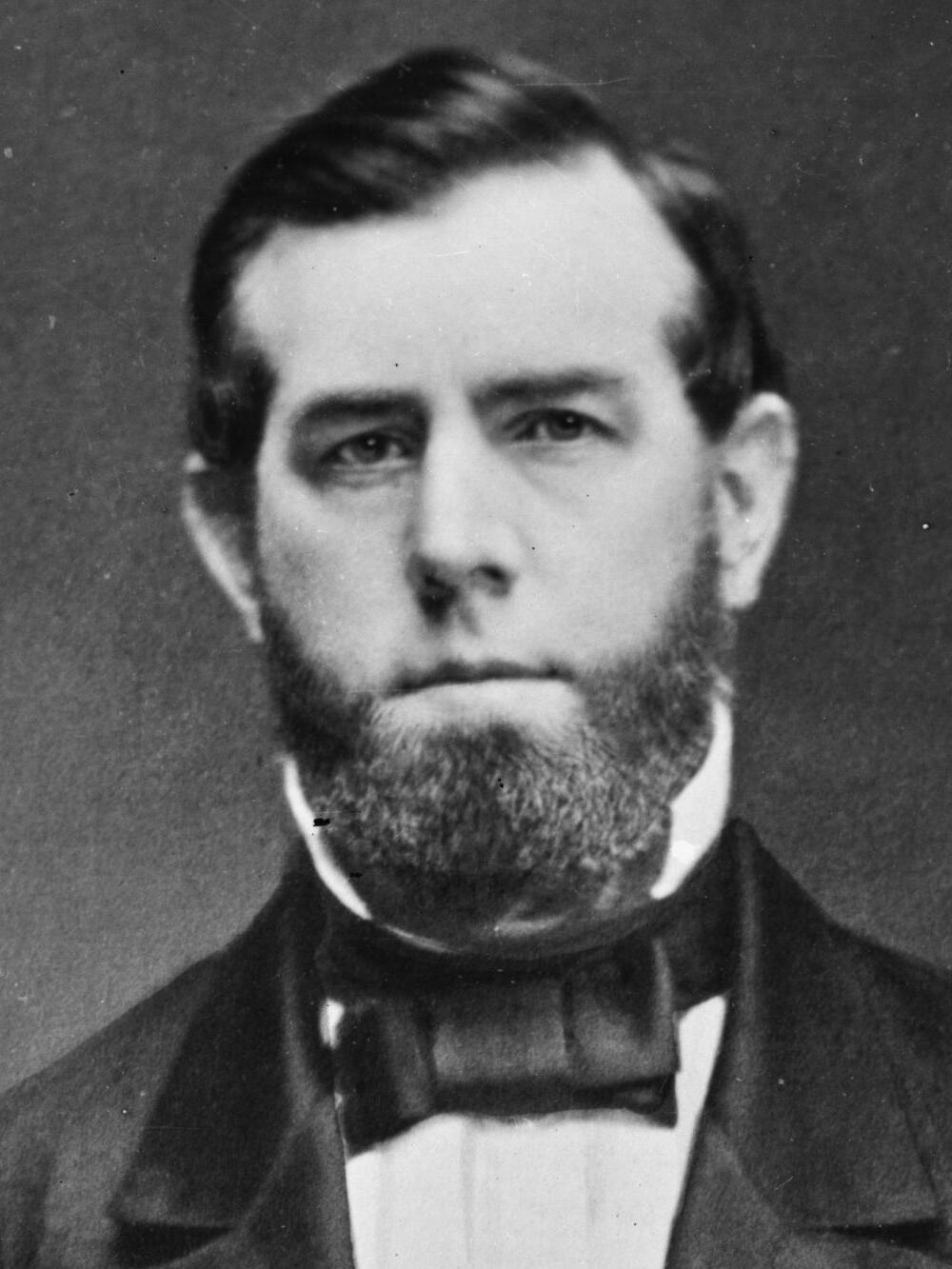

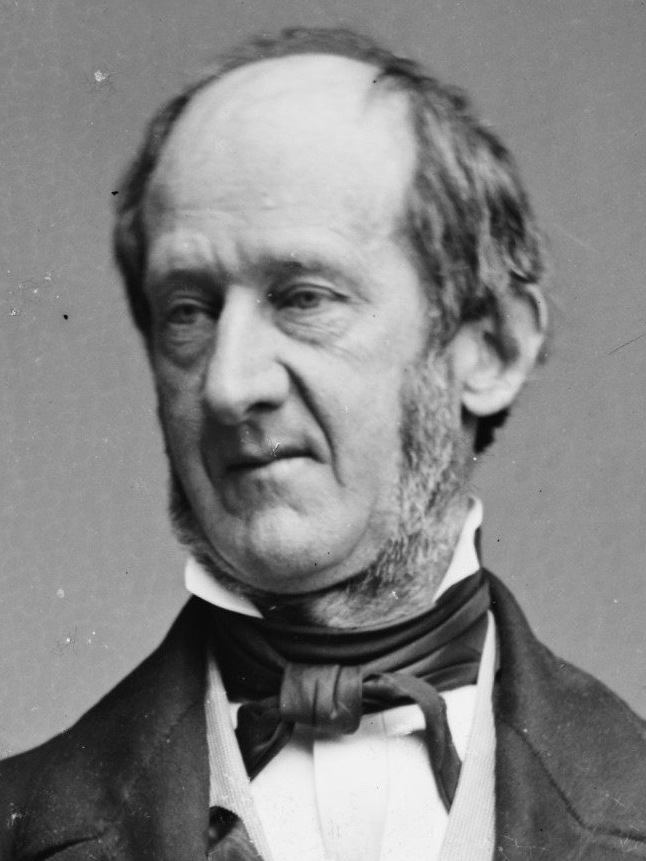
Nominee	David C. Broderick	James W. Coffroth	Edward Stanly
Party	Democratic	Know Nothing	Republican
Joint session	79	17	14
Percentage	70.54%	15.18%	12.50%
Senator before election
John B. Weller
Democratic
Elected Senator
David C. Broderick
Democratic

The 1857 United States Senate election in California was held on January 10, 1857, by the California State Legislature to elect a U.S. senator (Class 1) to represent the State of California in the United States Senate. In a special joint session, former Democratic lieutenant governor David C. Broderick was elected over Know Nothing State Senator James W. Coffroth and Republican former congressman from North Carolina Edward Stanly.

== Results ==
Election in the legislature (joint session)
Party	Candidate	Votes	%
Democratic	David C. Broderick	79	70.54%
Know Nothing	James W. Coffroth	17	15.18%
Republican	Edward Stanly	14	12.50%
Democratic	John B. Weller	1	0.89%
Know Nothing	Sarshel Bynum	1	0.89%
Total votes		112	100.00%
