= Brothers in Unity =

Literary society at Yale University, US

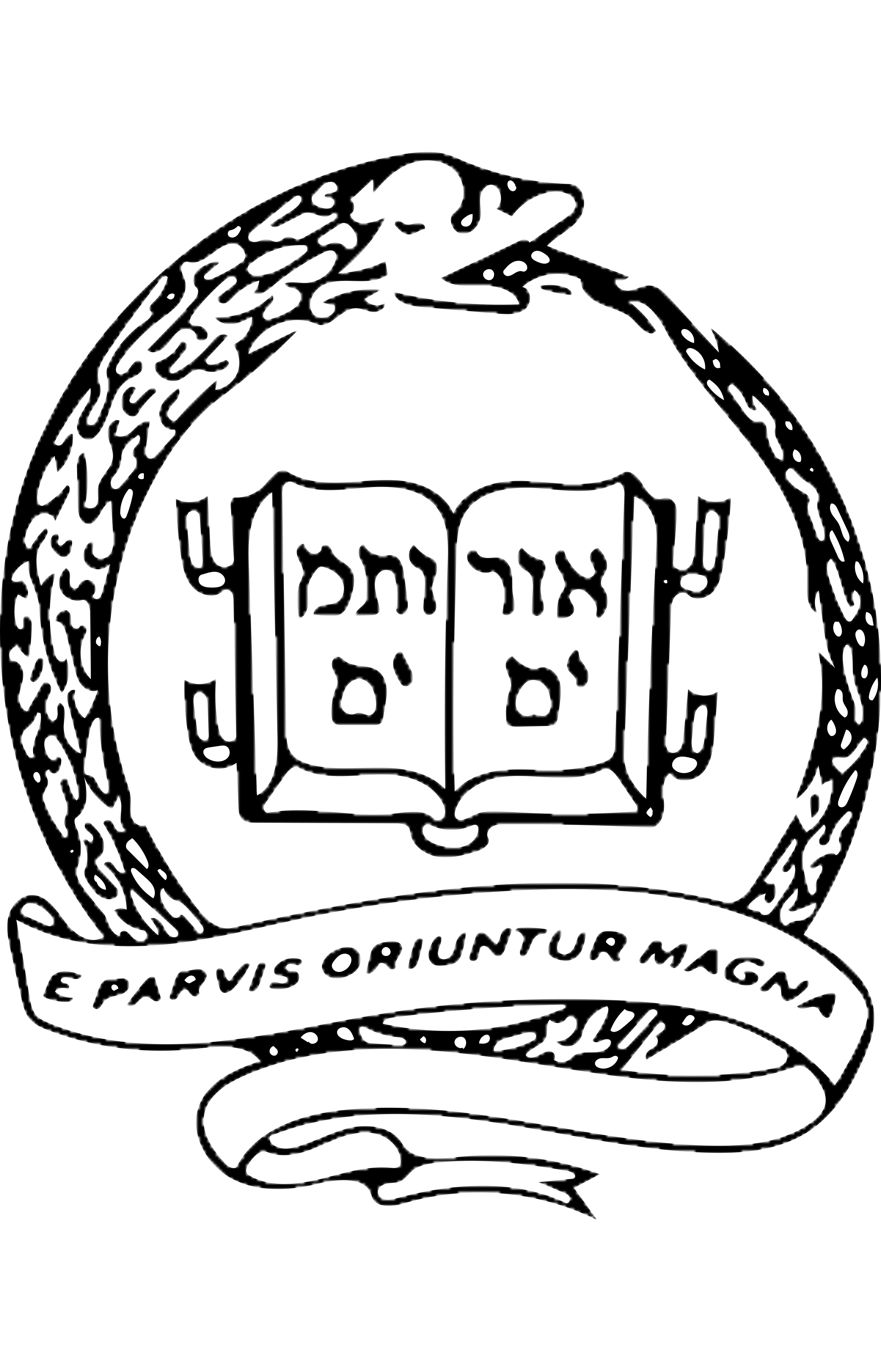
- Founded: 1768; 258 years ago–1878; revived 2021; Yale University
- Type: Literary
- Affiliation: Independent
- Status: Active
- Emphasis: Debating Society
- Scope: Local
- Motto: E parvis oriuntur magna "From small things come great things"
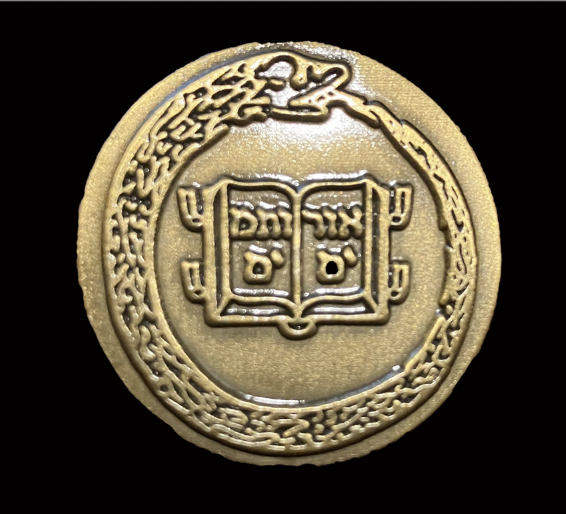
- Member badge
- Chapters: 1
- Nickname: Brothers
- Full Name: The Society of Brothers in Unity
- Headquarters: New Haven, Connecticut; United States
- Website: www.brothersinunity.org

Brothers in Unity (formally, the Society of Brothers in Unity) is an undergraduate literary and debating society at Yale University. Founded in 1768 as a literary and debating society that encompassed nearly half the student body at its 19th-century peak, the group disbanded in the late 1870s after donating its collection of books to help form Yale's central library.

It was revived in 2021 as a literary and debating society by members of the senior class and alumni. Unlike other Yale senior societies, Brothers in Unity admits students from all four undergraduate years.

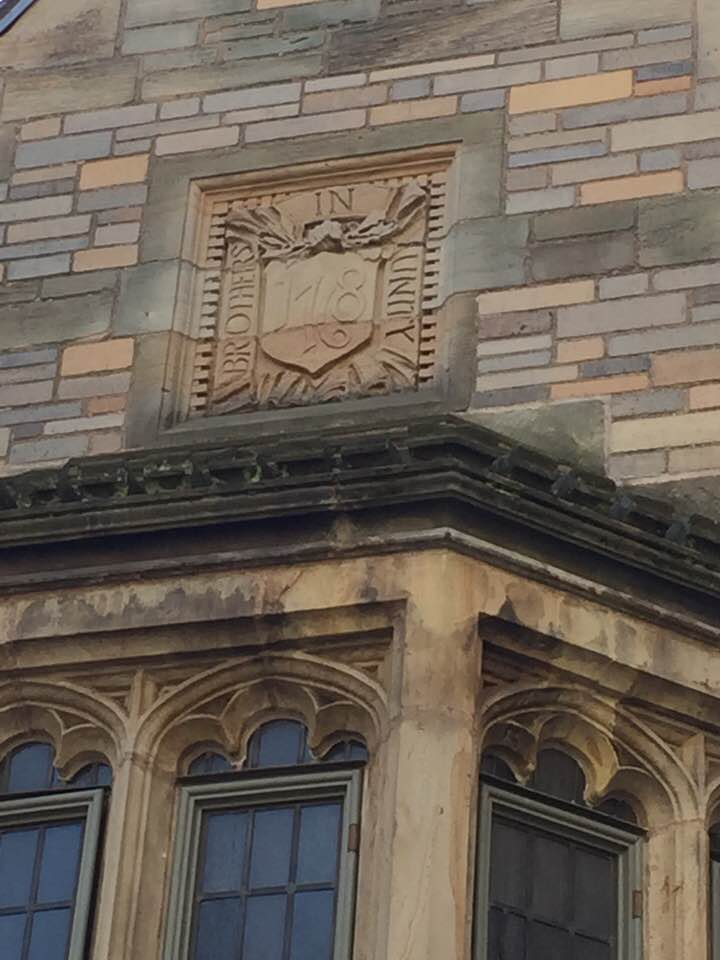
References to Brothers in Unity can be found throughout Yale's campus, including several within the courtyards of Branford College

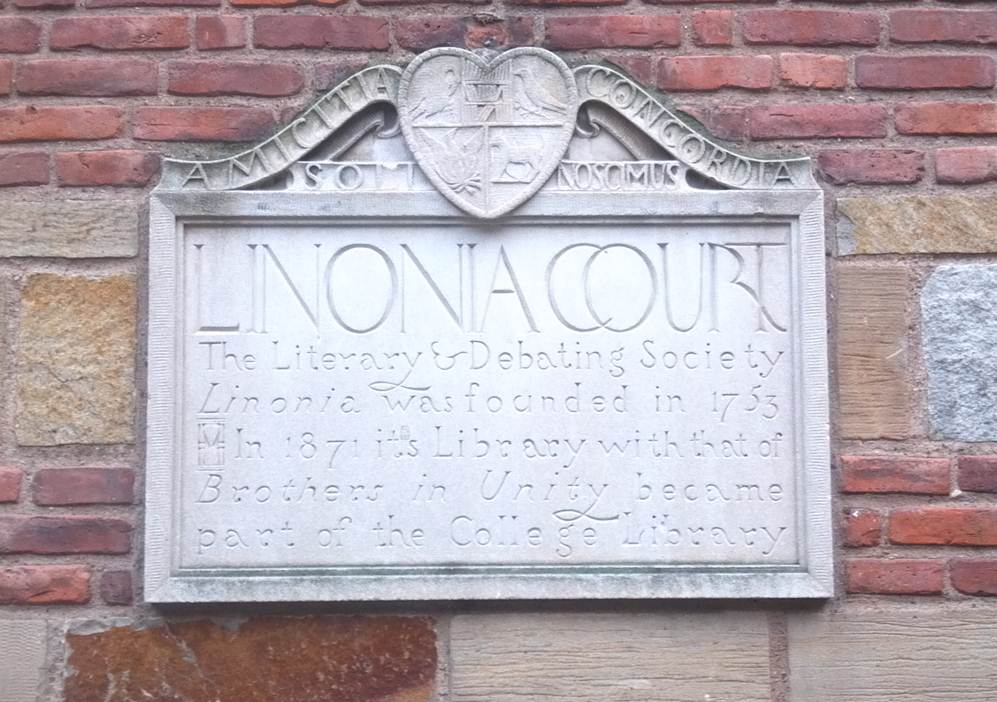
Brothers in Unity and Linonia Society memorial

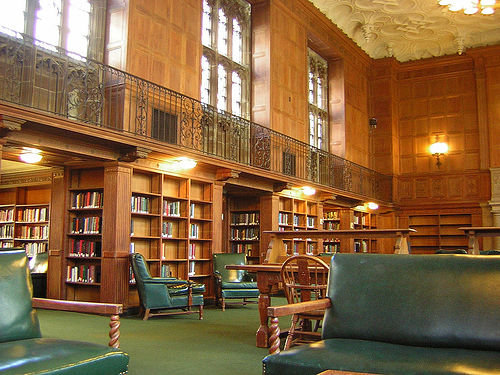
Linonia and Brothers Room, Sterling Memorial Library

== History ==
=== First incarnation ===
The Society of Brothers in Unity at Yale College was founded in 1768 by 21 members of the Yale classes of 1768, 1769, 1770, and 1771. The society was founded chiefly to reduce class separation among literary societies; at the time, Yale freshmen were not "received" into any society, and junior society members were forced into the servitude of seniors "under dread of the severest penalties".

David Humphreys, a freshman of the class of 1771, persuaded two members of the senior class, three junior class members, two sophomores, and 14 freshmen to support the establishment of a new society. Oliver Stanley as its first president.

The notion of including freshmen was challenged by two or three existing literary groups that waged "an incessant war" against the new society, as described in Brothers in Unity's 1841 catalog of members. But within a year, Brothers became fully independent, its popularity influencing other societies to reconsider their exclusion of first-year students. The Yale College freshman class of 1771 ultimately yielded 15 members to the new group, while the older Linonian Society accepted four—the first recorded time in which underclassmen were publicly accepted into a Yale society. It is speculated that this struggle launched the Brothers' century-long rivalry with Linonia.

Through at least 1841, the society is said to have followed the template of other debating societies, although operating under "Masonic secrecy," according to 19th-century Yale historian Ebenezer Baldwin. Baldwin wrote that the group, in conjunction with Linonia and the Calliopean Society, discussed scientific questions and gravitated towards literary pursuits. This is substantiated by the Brothers' public documentation, which says the society sought "lofty places in science, literature, and oratory" fields, as well as general "intellectual improvement." It also produced plays, including contemporary British dramas and works by its members.

By the beginning of the 19th century, most Yale College students joined either the Brothers or Linonia. "While the official curriculum remained extraordinarily rigid, the student body built a rich extra-curriculum through the literary societies that allowed them to explore subjects that would normally have no place in the college," wrote Elizabeth James in 2015. "Research papers, debates, and literary exercises gave vitality to intellectual life within the college. The societies provided a place where student voices and opinions could be heard, and their questions or thoughts about the world around them interrogated by their classmates." These societies helped pave Yale's way toward a broader European model of education.

Both groups held expansive literary collections, which they used to compete against each other. Between 1780 and 1841, the Brothers claimed to own more volumes than Linonia, although these assertions are disputed. Despite their rivalry, the two societies described each other as "ornaments" of Yale and "generous rivals." When Yale built its first central library in 1846, Linonia and Brothers in Unity accepted the library's invitation to house their collections in the new building. For several decades, the collections were maintained separately, each with a librarian, staff, catalogs, and building entrance. However, the society declined during the Civil War and against the competition of newer secret societies such as Skull and Bones. Linonia and Brothers proposed donating their collections to Yale in 1860, and this was finally done in 1872. These donations are commemorated in the Linonia and Brothers Room of Yale's Sterling Memorial Library. The reading room contains the Linonia and Brothers (L&B) collection, a travel collection, a collection devoted to medieval history, and books recently added to Sterling's collections.

Brothers in Unity disbanded after the library donation; various sources say this happened in 1871, 1872, or 1878.

=== Second incarnation (2021-present) ===
In 2021, 21 Yale undergraduates revived the defunct society in a different form. While the original Brothers had a relatively open admissions policy and a large membership, its new incarnation follows the model of Yale's restrictive and smaller senior secret societies.

The new group says it seeks members with professional experience in, or simply passion for, certain types of public service, including the U.S. armed forces, U.S. Congress, the U.S. foreign service, and U.S. intelligence community; and, in "exceptional circumstances", people who demonstrate business leadership or entrepreneurship.

The society is funded by the 1768 Foundation Inc., a 501(c)(3) public charity administered by alumni. The society hosts an annual dinner in Washington D.C. for its alumni and is a member of the Association of American Collegiate Literary Societies as of 2023.

== Symbols and traditions ==
Internally, members call the society the Brotherhood. In 1768 or 1769, the Brothers adopted the motto E parvis oriuntur magna, meaning "From small things come great things". Its values are chivalry, openness, and selflessness.

== Membership ==
Members of the group between 1768 and 1841 include 26 Yale valedictorians, several Supreme Court justices, one Chief Justice, six governors, 13 Senators, 45 Congressional representatives, a Secretary of the Navy, a Secretary of the Treasury, a Postmaster General, 14 presidents of colleges and universities, two U.S. Attorneys General, and a U.S. Vice President. By 1841, a total of 2,828 students had belonged to the group.

== Notable members ==
Many notable members are included in the 1841 and 1854 Catalogue.

Name	Class Year	Notability	References
George Edmund Badger	1816	U.S. Secretary of the Navy, U.S. Senator	
Henry Baldwin	1797	Supreme Court justice and U.S. Representative	
Leonard Bacon	1820	Abolitionist and congregational preacher	
Joel Barlow	1778	Ambassador to France, drafted the Treaty of Tripoli	
John Brown of Pittsfield	1771	Revolutionary War officer, a state legislator, and a Berkshire County judge	
John M. Clayton	1815	18th U.S. Secretary of State, U.S. Senator	
Moses Cleaveland	1777	Founded Cleveland, Ohio; Brigadier General of Connecticut militia	
Mason Fitch Cogswell	1780	Surgeon, pioneer of French sign language in the United States	
Carroll Cutler	1854	President of the Case Western Reserve University	
John Davis	1812	Governor of Massachusetts, U.S. senator and Representative	
Henry Durant	1827	Founded the University of California, Mayor of Oakland, California	
William Edmond	1778	politician	
Christopher Ellery	1787	U.S. Senator	
John Elliott	1794	U.S. Senator from Georgia.	
William Ely	1787	U.S. Representative from Massachusetts	
Jeremiah Evarts	1802	Missionary, reformer, and activist for the rights of Native Americans	
Stephen Clark Foster	1840	Mayor of Los Angeles.	
James Gadsden	1806	Adjutant General of the U.S. Army	
Ezekiel Gilbert	1778	U.S. Representative from New York	
Thomas R. Gold	1786	U.S. Representative	
Chauncey Goodrich	1776	U.S. Senator, 8th lieutenant governor of Connecticut	
Gideon Granger	1787	U.S. Postmaster General	
Richard Henry Green	1857	First African American to graduate from Yale	
Ray Greene	1784	U.S. Senator and Attorney General	
Thomas H. Hubbard	1799	U.S. Representative	
William Hull	1772	General in the War of 1812, Governor of Michigan	
David Humphreys	1771	American Revolutionary War colonel, Ambassador to Portugal	
James Lanman	1788	U.S. Senator from Connecticut, Secretary of State of New York. U.S. Representative	
Henry Meigs	1799	U.S. Senator from New York	
Samuel Morse	1810	Inventor of Morse code	
Thomas J. Oakley	1801	U.S. Representative from New York, Attorney General for New York.	
Peter Buell Porter	1791	12th U.S. Secretary of War	
Israel Smith	1781	Governor of Vermont, senator, and U.S. representative	
Benjamin Silliman	1796	chemist, first to distill petroleum, and a founder of the American Journal of Science	
John William Sterling	1864	Founder of Shearling & Sterling	
William Strong	1828	Supreme Court justice	
Alphonso Taft	1833	U.S. Secretary of War, U.S. Attorney General, founder of Skull and Bones	
Benjamin Tallmadge	1773	Spymaster and leader of the Culper Ring, Continental Army captain, U.S. representative	
Thomas Thacher	1872	lawyer	
Uriah Tracy	1778	U.S. senator	
Morrison Waite	1837	Chief Justice of the U.S. Supreme Court	
Noah Webster	1778	founding father, author of Merriam-Webster dictionary	
Yung Wing	1854	First Chinese student to graduate from an American university, businessman	
Oliver Wolcott Jr.	1778	U.S. Secretary of the Treasury and 24th governor of Connecticut	
William Channing Woodbridge	1812	Geographer and educational reformer	
Chauncey Langdon	1787	United States Representative from Vermont (1815-1817	
Theodore Dwight Woolsey	1820	President of Yale College, author, and academic	
