= George Washington Bowie =

American politician

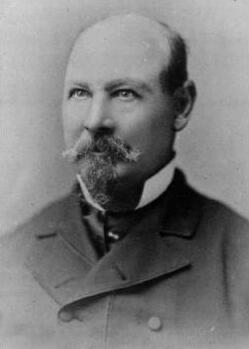
George Washington Bowie

George Washington Bowie (1827 – August 11, 1901), was a Union Army officer during the American Civil War, commanding the 5th Regiment California Volunteer Infantry and being brevetted Brigadier General of Volunteers.

George Washington Bowie was born in Maryland in 1827. He came to Burlington, Iowa while it was Iowa Territory. He became a delegate to the Second Constitutional Convention, which met at Iowa City in 1846. He was a representative from Des Moines County in the First General Assembly of Iowa. In the Mexican–American War he was commissioned a first lieutenant of U. S. infantry March 8, 1847 and assigned to Company K, Fifteenth Infantry. He was commissioned captain July 8, 1847. For his gallant and meritorious conduct at Battle of Contreras and Battle of Churubusco he was brevetted major. After he was mustered out of the service August 4, 1848, he returned to Burlington where he was one of its leading lawyers. He made his home there until 1850, when he emigrated to California.

In California Bowie became involved in politics, elected to the California state assembly in 1854. He made unsuccessful campaigns for the United States House of Representatives in 1854, Governor of California in 1857, and California Attorney General in 1860.

With the outbreak of the American Civil War, Bowie was commissioned as the Colonel of the 5th Regiment California Volunteer Infantry. His regiment served in the California Column in New Mexico Territory primarily as garrison troops in the District of Arizona. He was the commander of the District of Arizona from January 29, 1864 to November, 1864 when he and his regiment were mustered out. He was brevetted Brigadier General of Volunteers on March 13, 1865.

Bowie died on August 11, 1901.

== See also ==
- List of American Civil War brevet generals (Union)

Party political offices
Preceded by J. Neely Johnson	Know Nothing nominee for Governor of California; 1857	Succeeded by None
