= Richard Henry Greene =

African-American physician

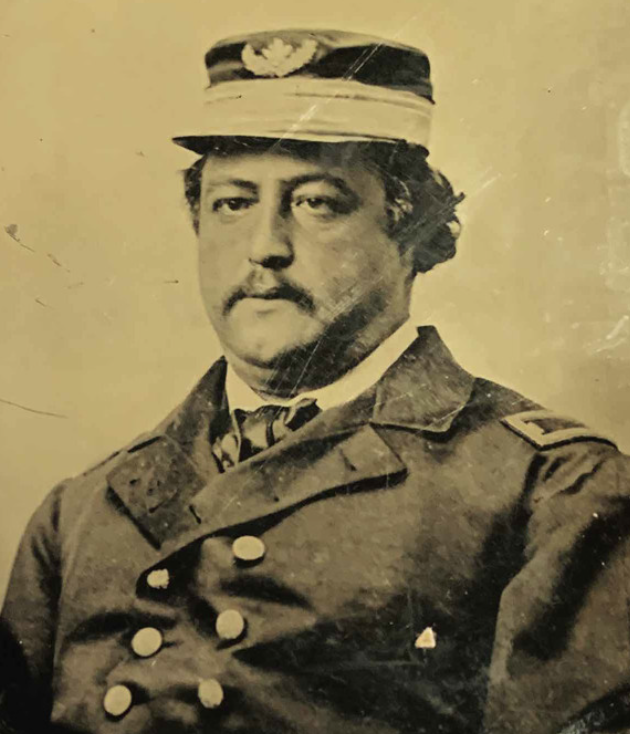
- Born: Richard Henry Green; 1833; New Haven, Connecticut, US
- Died: March 23, 1877 (aged 43–44); Hoosick, New York, US
- Burial place: Old Bennington Cemetery, Vermont
- Education: B.A., Yale College, 1857. MD, Dartmouth University, 1864.
- Occupation: Physician
- Spouse: Charlotte "Lottie" Greene
- Military career
- Service: U.S. Navy
- Service years: 5 November 1863-18 May 1865
- Rank: Acting Assistant Surgeon

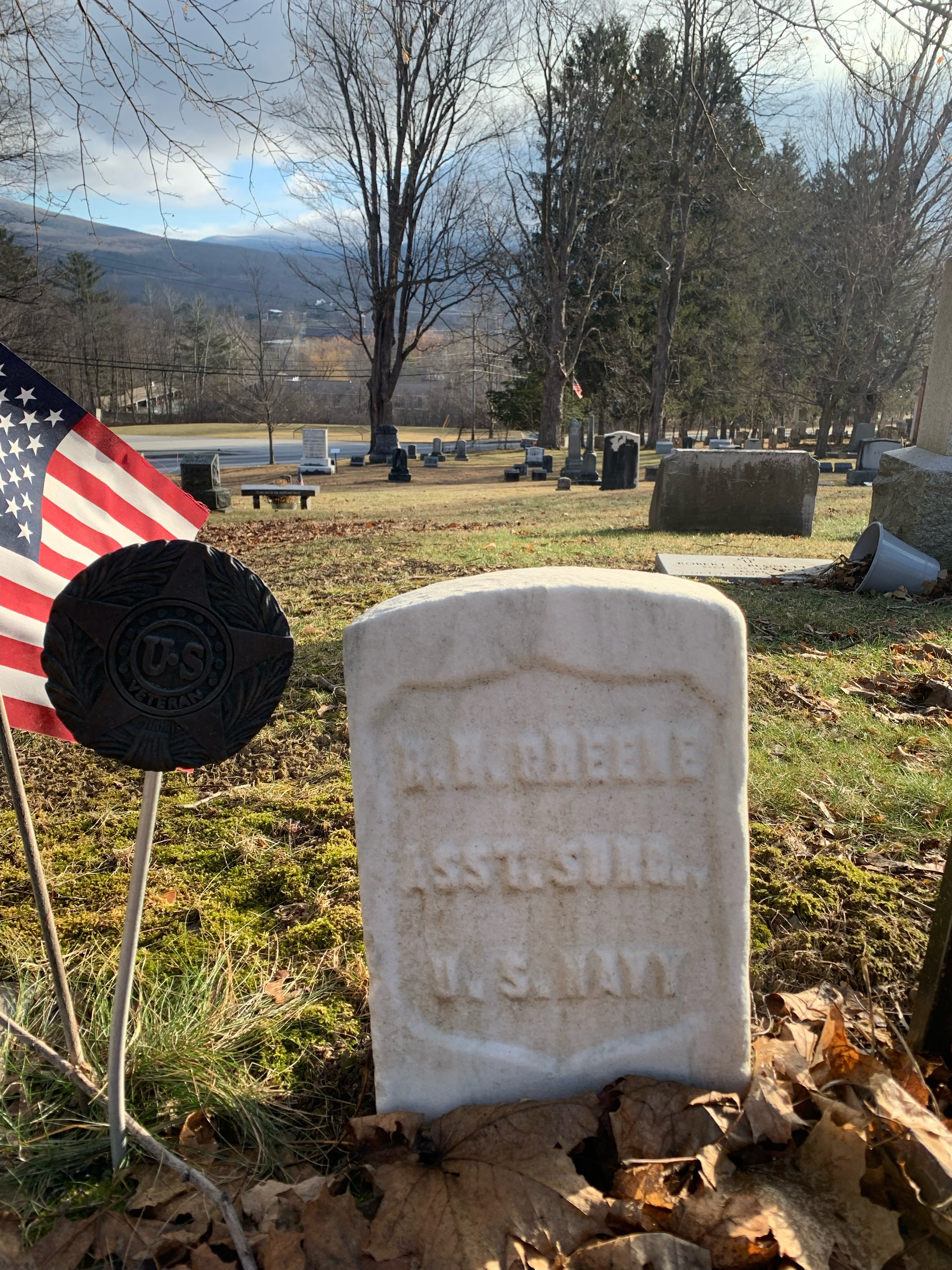
Gravestone in Old Bennington Cemetery, Vermont

Richard Henry Greene (1833–1877) was the first African American to graduate from Yale University. After a brief stint as a schoolteacher, he worked mainly as a medical doctor in Hoosick, New York. During the American Civil War, he received an MD from Dartmouth and served as an acting assistant surgeon in the United States Navy. Since 2014, research has unearthed documents about his life and two photographs, which shed light on his personal views, racial identity, personal and professional life, and death.

== Early life ==
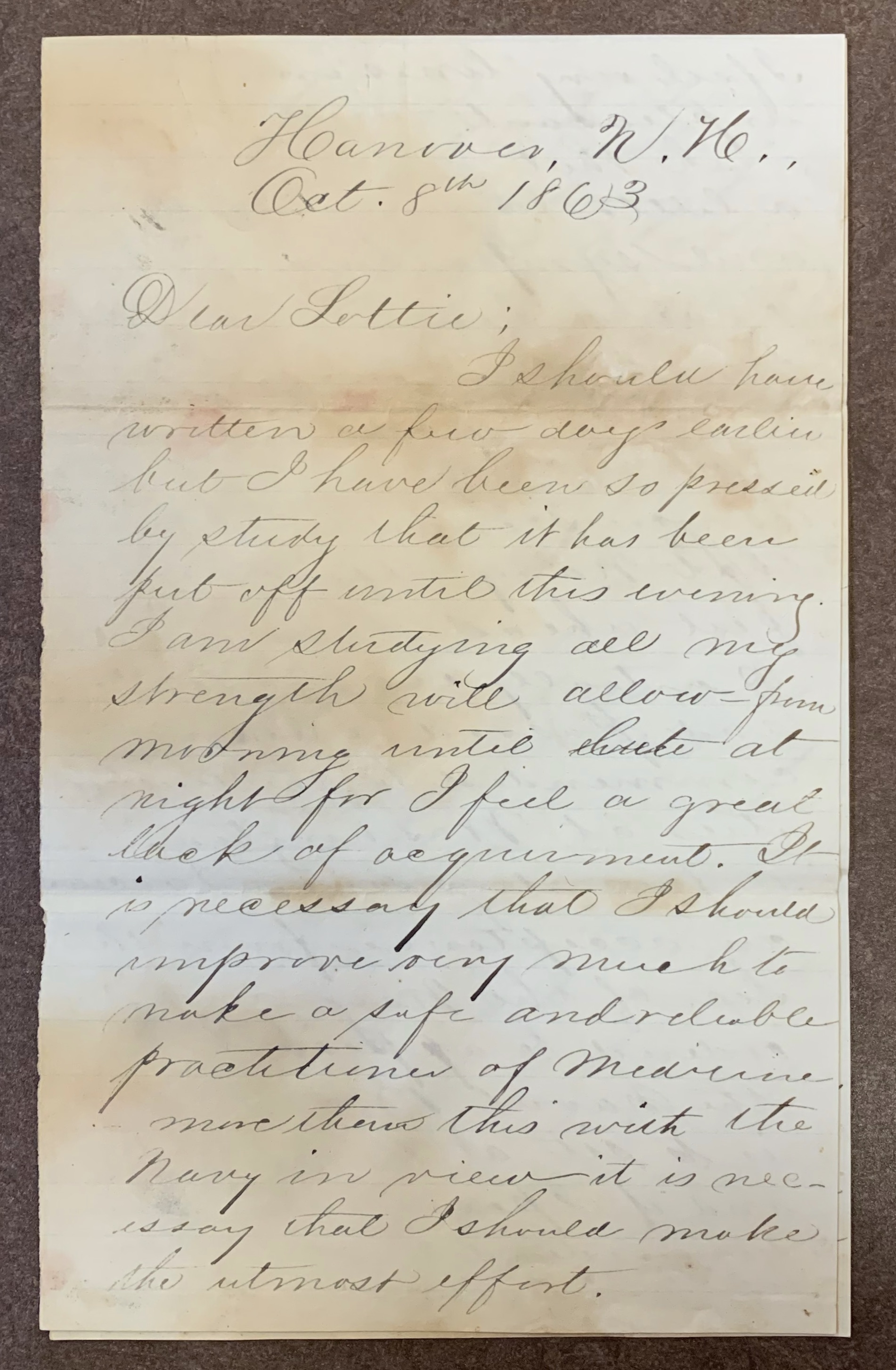
Letter to wife Lottie about studying medicine at Dartmouth, Oct. 8, 1863

Greene was born in New Haven, Connecticut, to Richard Green, a bootmaker who worked and lived some four blocks from the Yale campus, near the corner of State and Chapel Streets. Coming from Wilmington, North Carolina, by 1843 he co-owned a bootmaking company, Wright & Green. The elder Green helped establish St. Luke’s Episcopal Church, an African-American church on nearby Park Street.

To prepare for admission to college, Greene studied Latin, Greek, and mathematics with Lucius Wooster Fitch, an 1840 graduate of Yale and a son of the Yale College pastor. He entered Yale in 1853 and he commuted from his home in a Black neighborhood, which caused him to be marked late for its 6 a.m. mandatory prayer service, or for class, for which he was apparently excused. In college, his friends included the son of Henry Dutton (a Yale professor who became the Governor of Connecticut). Greene later joined the literary society Brothers in Unity, Sigma Delta fraternity, and Wolf's Head Society. He graduated with a bachelor of arts degree in 1857. After graduating, Greene taught school in Milford, Connecticut, and after a year and a half took a teaching job at the Bennington Seminary in Bennington, Vermont. by 1861, he had changed the spelling of his surname to Greene.

Beginning in March 1860, he studied medicine at Dartmouth College, and he received his MD in 1864. In letters to his fiancee, Greene wrote, "I am studying all my strength will allow -- from morning until late at night for I feel a great lack of acquirement."

== Military service ==
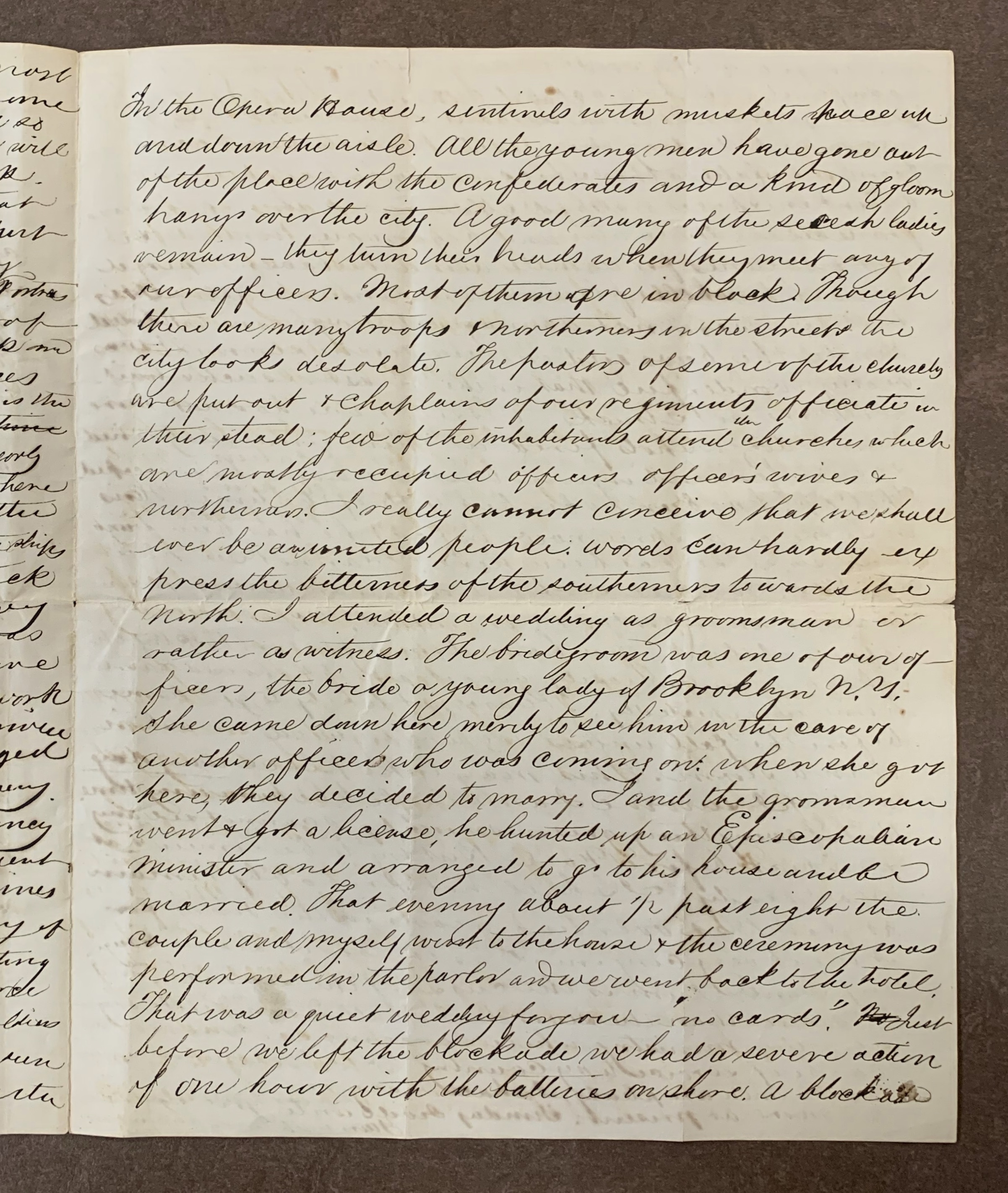
Letter about mood in the South during the Civil War

Two years into the American Civil War, in November 1863, Greene entered the U.S. Navy as an acting assistant surgeon. According to an 1877 letter from his father to the Yale secretary, Greene "was sent to the U.S. Steamer State of Georgia blockading off N. Carolina under Admiral Porter. He was on that vessel about a year, when she was taken out of commission, and he was put on waiting order 3 weeks. During that time he was married to Miss Charlotte Caldwell of Bennington, VT. Then he was ordered to the Steamer Seneca and was at the taking of Fort Fisher, & the other fortifications in the Cape Fear river." On the USS Seneca and he handled cases of yellow fever, and smallpox.

Greene wrote to his wife Lottie about seeing Norfolk, Virginia and he attested to local views of the Union occupation:

All the young men have gone out of the place with the Confederates and a kind of gloom hangs over the city. A good many of the secesh [Secessionist] ladies remain—they turn their heads when they meet any of our officers. . . . I really cannot conceive that we shall ever be a united people. Words can hardly express the bitterness of the Southerners toward the North.

In September 1864, he was granted military leave to marry in Bennington, Vermont. He left the military in 1865.

== Life in New York ==
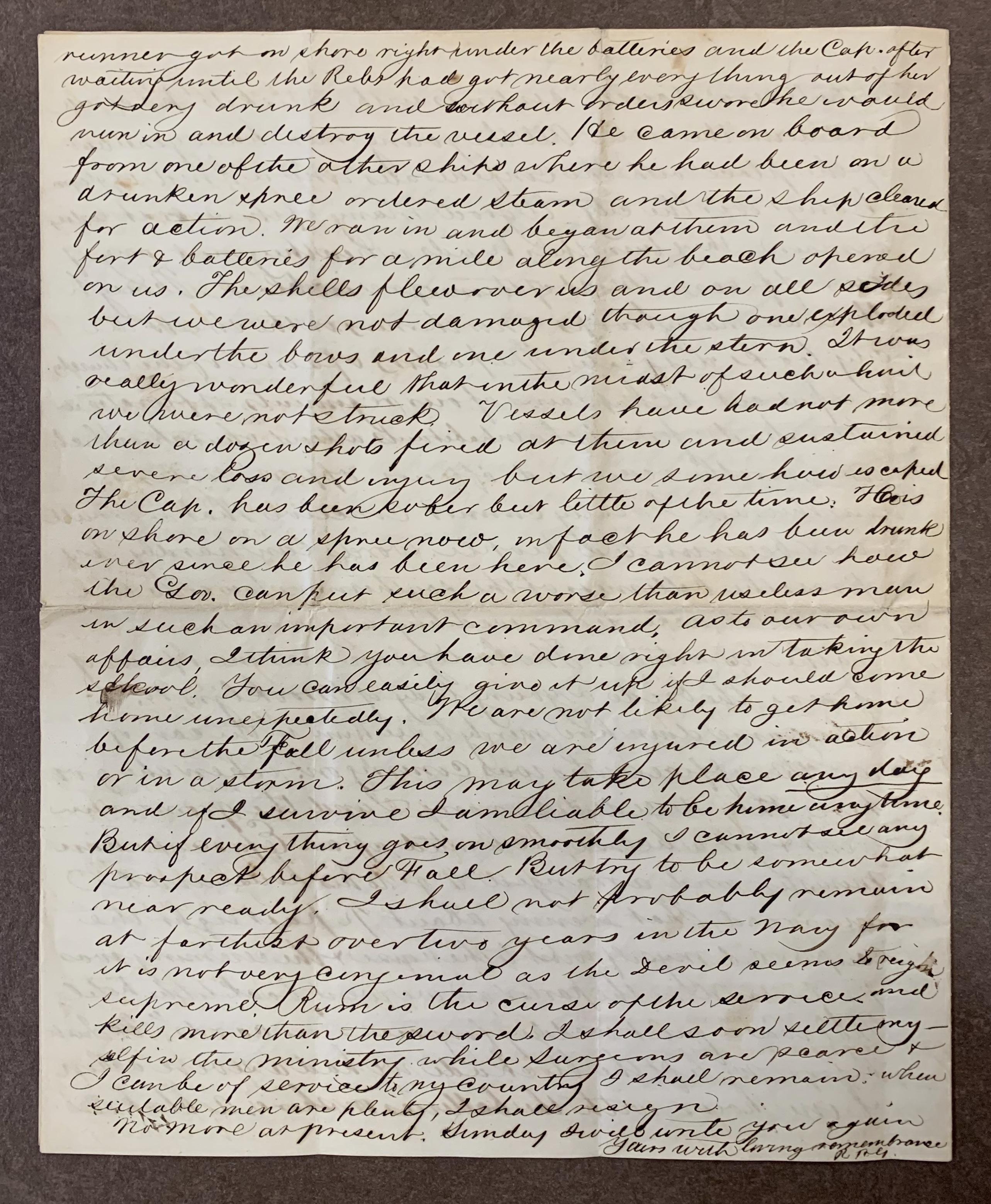
Letter discussing service to his country, men drinking, and ministry

After the war, Greene and his wife (known as Lottie) initially lived in Cambridge, New York, and then moved to Hoosick, New York. He practiced medicine after the war, though he did consider whether to return to teaching or to take up Christian ministry.

"He was fond of the study of natural history and spent much time collecting plants and objects of interest in that department. He was a most amiable and genial man, and a practical Christian. He was a member of the County Medical society since 1872", according to an 1897 book, Landmarks of Rensselaer County, New York. According to Yale's journalist, he was a "respected physician" as indicated by a letter from a Connecticut patient, "I felt a confidence in you which I do not entertain toward any physician near us."

== Death and descendents ==
Greene died in Hoosick on March 23, 1877, "of disease of the heart leaving a wife & daughter," according to his father's letter. His burial plot in Bennington contains a military headstone and a biographical plaque.

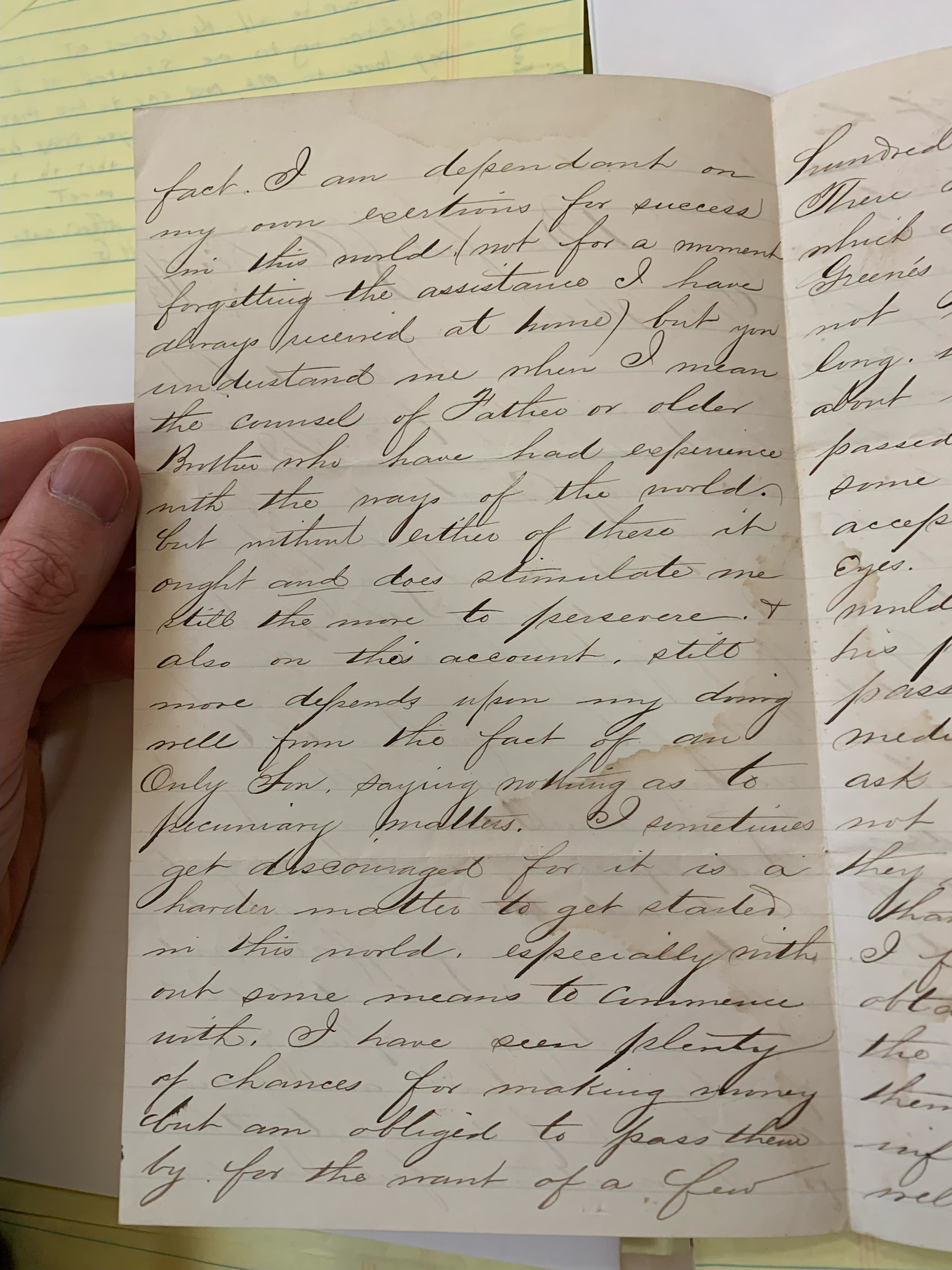
Letter discussing financial challenges

Branch, a Yale journalist, speculates that Greene experienced John Henryism, that is, health deterioration while coping with social discrimination, such as racism. As he wrote to Lottie, "You knew when you accepted me you accepted a poor man who could not look forward in any way to a life of wealth and ease but to a life of labor and perhaps straitened circumstances."

Greene's home in Hoosick was still owned (as of 2023) by a descendent, who recalled being told about his medical books.

== Racial identity ==
Greene grew up in a Black neighborhood in New Haven. His father was listed in city records as African-American ("colored") and Greene himself was recorded by the federal census as "mulatto" in 1850 and as black in 1860, one of his last years in New Haven. However, Greene's wife was white and Yale historian Judith Schiff speculates that he lived as a white person and she notes that he was recorded in the 1870 federal census as white.

Still, Branch notes that the census record "is not dispositive... there is no reference to his being Black in any of the scant published records about him in his years in the Navy or afterward." As the researcher who discovered Greene's papers said told The New York Times, "It’s quite possible the census taker may have shown up at the door, seen Green[e] and listed him as white in his own judgment. Or he might have only seen the daughter and the mother and then filled in for the father.”

== Research ==
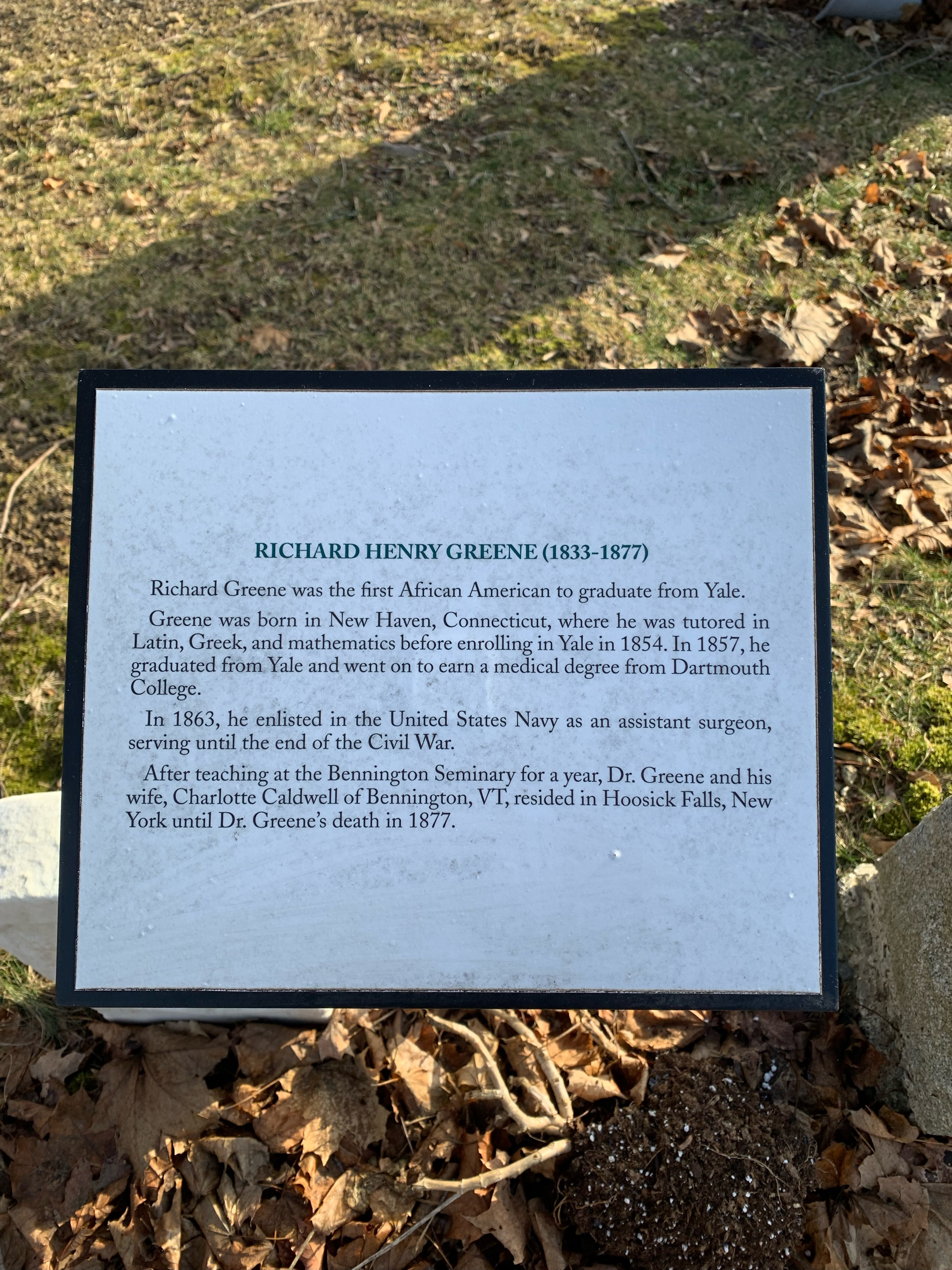
Memorial plaque with corrected name and Yale connection

Greene's status as an early graduate of Yale was reported as early as 1875 in the American Educational Annual. Yet it was not until 2014 that more information about Greene was published, following the discovery of some of his letters, and other documents, by Rick Stattler, an American history expert at Swann Galleries. Documents pertaining to Greene are archived by the Beinecke Rare Book & Manuscript Library, including letters, financial records, memorabilia, and papers of his wife, daughter, and a brother-in-law. The Greene collection was donated by William Reese, a Yale alumnus and rare book collector.
