= USS State of Georgia =

Gunboat of the United States Navy

History

United States
- Name: USS State of Georgia
- Builder: Vaughn & Lynn, Philadelphia
- Launched: 1851
- Acquired: 25 September 1861
- Commissioned: 20 November 1861
- Decommissioned: 10 September 1864
- Recommissioned: 5 January 1865
- Decommissioned: 9 September 1865
- Stricken: 1865 (est.)
- Fate: Sold, 25 October 1865

General characteristics
- Type: Side-wheel steamer
- Displacement: 1,204 long tons (1,223 t)
- Length: 200 ft (61 m)
- Beam: 33 ft (10 m)
- Draft: 14 ft (4.3 m)
- Depth of hold: 21 ft (6.4 m)
- Propulsion: Steam engine; side wheels
- Complement: 113
- Armament: 6 × 8 in (200 mm) 55-cwt guns; 2 × 32-pounder guns; 1 × 30-pounder Parrott rifle

USS State of Georgia was a large steamer with powerful guns acquired by the Union Navy during the American Civil War. State of Georgia, with her crew of 113 sailors and officers, was used by the Union Navy as a gunboat in its blockade of Confederate waterways.

A side-wheel steamer built at Philadelphia, Pennsylvania, in 1851 by Vaughn & Lynn, the ship was purchased by the Union Navy at Philadelphia on 25 September 1861 from the Philadelphia and Savannah Steamship Co. It was commissioned at the Philadelphia Navy Yard on 20 November 1861, Commander James F. Armstrong in command.

== Civil War operations ==
=== Assigned to the North Atlantic Blockade ===
The side-wheel steamer joined the North Atlantic Blockading Squadron at Hampton Roads, Virginia, on 26 November 1861. It sailed the next day to take up its blockade station off Beaufort, North Carolina, and arrived there on the 28th.

=== Capture of blockade runners Constitution and Nassau ===
On 22 May off Wilmington, North Carolina, she helped USS Mount Vernon and USS Victoria capture the steamer Constitution of Albany, New York, and sent her to port for adjudication for trading with the enemy. Six days later, she and Victoria captured steamer Nassau—the former notorious blockade runner Gordon—near Fort Casswell, North Carolina. The prize—which had been carrying Enfield rifles, ammunition, and military stores for the Southern Army—was sent to New York City for action by the prize court.

=== State of Georgia collides with USS Mystic and is damaged ===
On 26 September, State of Georgia and USS Mystic chased an unidentified schooner ashore at New Inlet, North Carolina, and destroyed her. Two days later, the two blockaders again cooperated, seizing English steamer Sunbeam as it attempted to run the blockade off Wilmington. But the two Union ships collided in the dark; and State of Georgia was forced to sail to the Washington Navy Yard early in October for repairs which kept her out of action until late in December.

She then towed the monitor USS Passaic from Hampton Roads to Beaufort and returned to Norfolk, Virginia, on 3 January 1863 before resuming blockade duty off Wilmington.

=== Chasing blockade runner Mary Jane ashore ===
In February, she towed Union ironclad USS Nahant to Port Royal, South Carolina, but soon returned to New Inlet. There, she took possession of abandoned English schooner Annie of Nassau, laden with salt and medicine. On 24 March, State of Georgia and Mount Vernon chased schooner Mary Jane ashore where she was abandoned by her crew. Boat parties from the blockaders boarded the schooner and the steamer towed her to deep water.

The next day, the two blockaders seized blockade-running schooner Rising Daunt with a large cargo of salt.

=== Repaired in Philadelphia, then returned to blockade service ===
Late in July, State of Georgia returned to Philadelphia for extensive repairs and was decommissioned there on 10 August.

Recommissioned on 27 November 1863, the steamer returned to the North Atlantic Blockading Squadron and served on blockade duty primarily off Wilmington. The ship's acting assistant surgeon was Richard Henry Green, Yale University's first African American graduate. until forced to sail north again late in the summer of 1864 for yard work. She was decommissioned at the New York Navy Yard on 10 September 1864.

=== Assigned to the South Atlantic blockade ===
Recommissioned on 5 January 1865, State of Georgia was assigned to the South Atlantic Blockading Squadron for the closing months of the Civil War. She proceeded to the coast of South Carolina to join in naval operations clearing the way and supporting General William Tecumseh Sherman's path as he started marching north from Savannah, Georgia.

=== Bull’s Bay, South Carolina, Operations ===
On 24 January, she was at Georgetown, South Carolina, to prevent the erection of Southern batteries. In February, she participated in the operations which took Bull's Bay, South Carolina. In March, the ship moved to Port Royal, South Carolina, and remained in that vicinity through the last days of the Confederacy.

=== Carrying dispatches to troubled Bogota, Colombia ===
On 11 April, State of Georgia got underway from Port Royal and proceeded to Aspinwall, New Granada to carry dispatches to the American minister at Bogota, learn of conditions on the isthmus, and protect the interests of the United States.

=== Rescuing survivors of the Golden Rule ===
On 9 June, State of Georgia and USS Huntsville departed Aspinwall and proceeded to a position near Roncador Bank off the coast of Nicaragua to rescue the survivors of the wrecked Golden Rule.

== Post-war decommissioning, sale, and subsequent maritime career ==
After returning home late in the summer, State of Georgia was decommissioned at New York City on 9 September 1865. She was sold at public auction there on 25 October 1865 to a Capt. G. Wright and was redocumented as Andrew Johnson on 9 May 1866. On 5 October 1866, she was driven ashore at Currituck Inlet, North Carolina, during a hurricane, and was a total loss.
