= USS Wyandotte (1853) =

Gunboat of the United States Navy

History

United States
- Name: Western Port / Wyandotte
- Namesake: Western Port was her previous name retained; Wyandotte was for Wyandotte, Michigan
- Launched: 1853
- Acquired: 1858
- Commissioned: 27 October 1858
- Decommissioned: 28 May 1859
- Renamed: USS Wyandotte
- Recommissioned: 19 September 1859
- Decommissioned: 3 June 1865
- Fate: Sold 12 July 1865; Wrecked 26 January 1866 while in merchant service

General characteristics
- Displacement: 464 tons
- Propulsion: Steam engine; one screw
- Speed: 7 knots
- Armament: four 32-pounder (14.5-kg) guns; one 24-pounder (10.9-kg) Dahlgren howitzer

USS Wyandotte, originally USS Western Port, was a steamer acquired by the Navy as a gunboat for the Paraguay expedition in 1858. When the crisis of the American Civil War occurred, she operated in support of the Union Navy blockade of Confederate waterways.

== Paraguay expedition of 1858 ==
Western Port – a former merchant steamer built at Philadelphia, in 1853 – was chartered by the United States Department of the Navy in the autumn of 1858 to participate in an American naval expedition up the Paraná River to Asunción, Paraguay. After the vessel had been fitted out as a gunboat, she was commissioned as USS Western Port on 27 October 1858, Commander Thomas T. Hunter in command.

=== Conflict with Paraguay ===
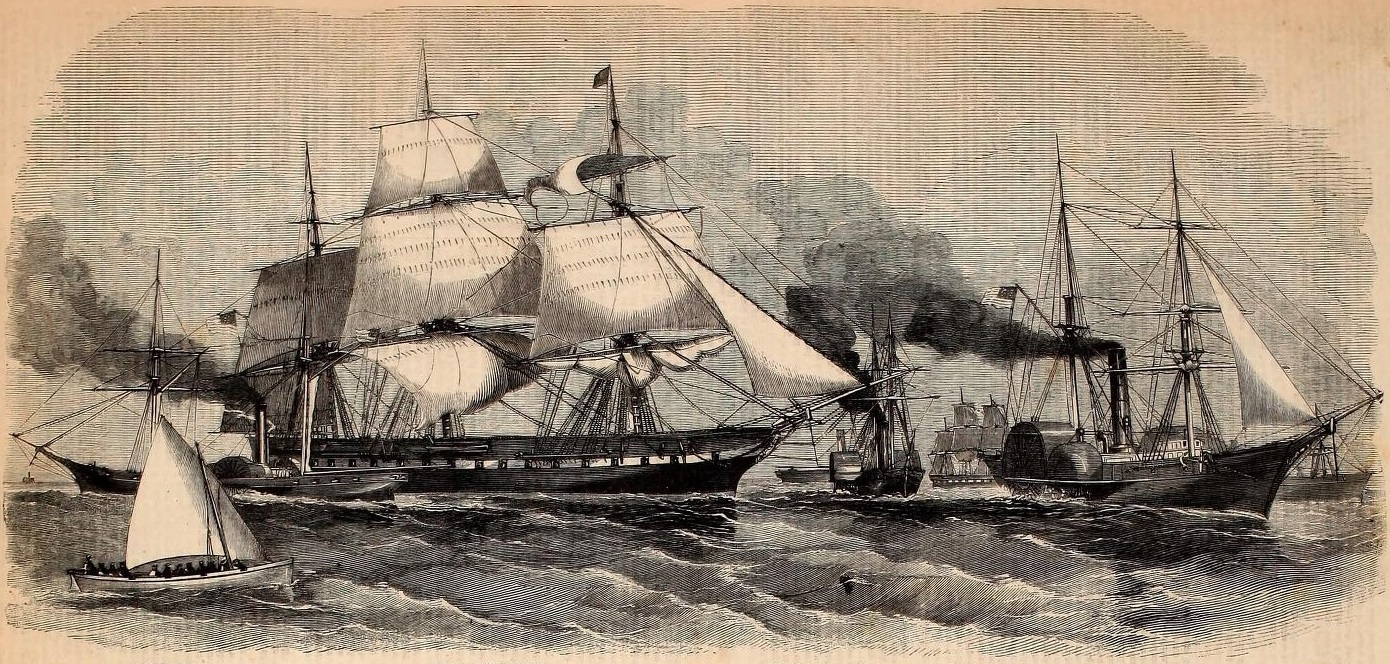
The Paraguay Squadron (Harper's Weekly, New York, October 16, 1858).

Western Port soon sailed for South American waters and – at Montevideo, Uruguay, – joined the task force commanded by Flag Officer William Branford Shubrick, which had been assembled to support the negotiations of United States Commissioner to Paraguay, James Butler Bowlin. President of the United States James Buchanan had appointed Bowlin to seek redress for the shelling of the U.S. Navy sidewheel gunboat USS Water Witch in 1855, which had resulted in the death of the American ship's helmsman.

The Paraguay expedition got underway from Montevideo on 30 December 1858 and ascended the Río de la Plata, the Paraná River, and the Paraguay River. She arrived off Asunción on 25 January 1859, and Bowlin went ashore to conduct negotiations which succeeded in winning an apology to the United States and a large indemnity for survivors of the dead helmsman. Bowling also signed a new commercial treaty between the United States and Paraguay.

After the conclusion of the negotiations, Western Port returned to the United States and was decommissioned on 28 May 1859. She was purchased by the Navy Department on 6 June 1859 and renamed Wyandotte.

== As USS Wyandotte ==
After repairs, Wyandotte was recommissioned on 19 September 1859 and assigned to the Home Squadron. She spent much of the next year cruising – for the most part in the Caribbean – in an effort to suppress the slave trade.

=== Captures slave ship William ===
Landing of a cargo of slaves from the slave ship Williams, after capture by the Wyandotte

On 9 May 1860, Wyandotte captured the barque William – a slave ship carrying 570 Africans at the time of her capture – off the Isle of Pines near the south coast of Cuba. She took her prize to Florida and arrived at Key West, Florida, on 12 May 1860. The ship landed the slaves on 16 May, turned the prize over to a United States Marshall on 22 May, and soon resumed her cruising.

=== Operations at Key West ===
As the threat of secession of the Southern United States grew in the mid-and late autumn of 1860, Wyandotte guarded and reprovisioned United States Government military installations along the United States Gulf Coast. On 16 November 1860, she was ordered to protect Fort Taylor at Key West, Florida, while the steamer USS Mohawk watched Fort Jefferson. These actions saved Key West for the Union, permitting its wartime use as the home port of the U.S. Navy's Gulf Blockading Squadron.

== American Civil War ==
=== Escape from Pensacola ===
In mid-December 1860, Wyandotte steamed to Pensacola, Florida, and entered the drydock at Pensacola Navy Yard to have her fouled bottom scraped and to receive minor repairs. She was refloated on 9 January 1861 and refused to surrender when Confederate forces took over the navy yard three days later. Instead, she towed the stores ship USS Supply out to sea.

Wyandotte remained in Pensacola Bay, performing valuable observation and communication duty. She transported troops from Fort Barrancas, Florida, to Fort Pickens on 10 February 1861 and regularly patrolled the inner shore of Santa Rosa Island, Florida, to prevent Confederate soldiers from attacking Fort Pickens by land.

=== Reinforcement of Fort Pickens ===
Wyandotte took part in the nighttime reinforcement of Fort Pickens on 12 April 1861, the day the American Civil War began with the Confederate shelling of Fort Sumter in South Carolina. With the outbreak of hostilities, Wyandotte joined the Gulf Blockading Squadron on 17 May 1861. After carrying out patrol and transport assignments, she proceeded to the New York Navy Yard in Brooklyn, New York, for major repairs, arriving there on 23 August 1861.

=== South Atlantic Blockading Squadron ===
On 5 December 1861, Wyandotte departed New York City bound for Port Royal, South Carolina, and duty with the South Atlantic Blockading Squadron. From there, she was dispatched to Tybee Island, Georgia, for reconnaissance work on 19 December 1861 and then was transferred to the blockade off Wassaw Sound, Georgia, on 23 February 1862. Wyandotte returned to Port Royal in late April 1862 and proceeded to the blockade off Mosquito Inlet, Florida, on 12 May 1862. She returned to Port Royal in July 1862, and arrived in New York City a second time on 25 July 1862 for extensive repairs at the New York Navy Yard.

=== North Atlantic Blockading Squadron ===
Wyandotte left the navy yard on 1 September 1862 for duty in the Potomac River with the Potomac Flotilla. She was reassigned to the North Atlantic Blockading Squadron at Hampton Roads, Virginia, on 7 October 1862, deploying off Fort Monroe, Virginia, as a guard ship.

On detail, Wyandotte salvaged valuable supplies from the schooner Marie Banks, wrecked off Cape Henry Light, Virginia, on 10 February 1863. She was repaired at the Norfolk Navy Yard in Portsmouth, Virginia, and got underway again on 11 April 1863 to resume blockade duty. However, badly strained, Wyandotte could no longer withstand rolling seas and was condemned as fit for guard duty only on 3 October 1863. She spent the remainder of the war off Norfolk, Virginia.

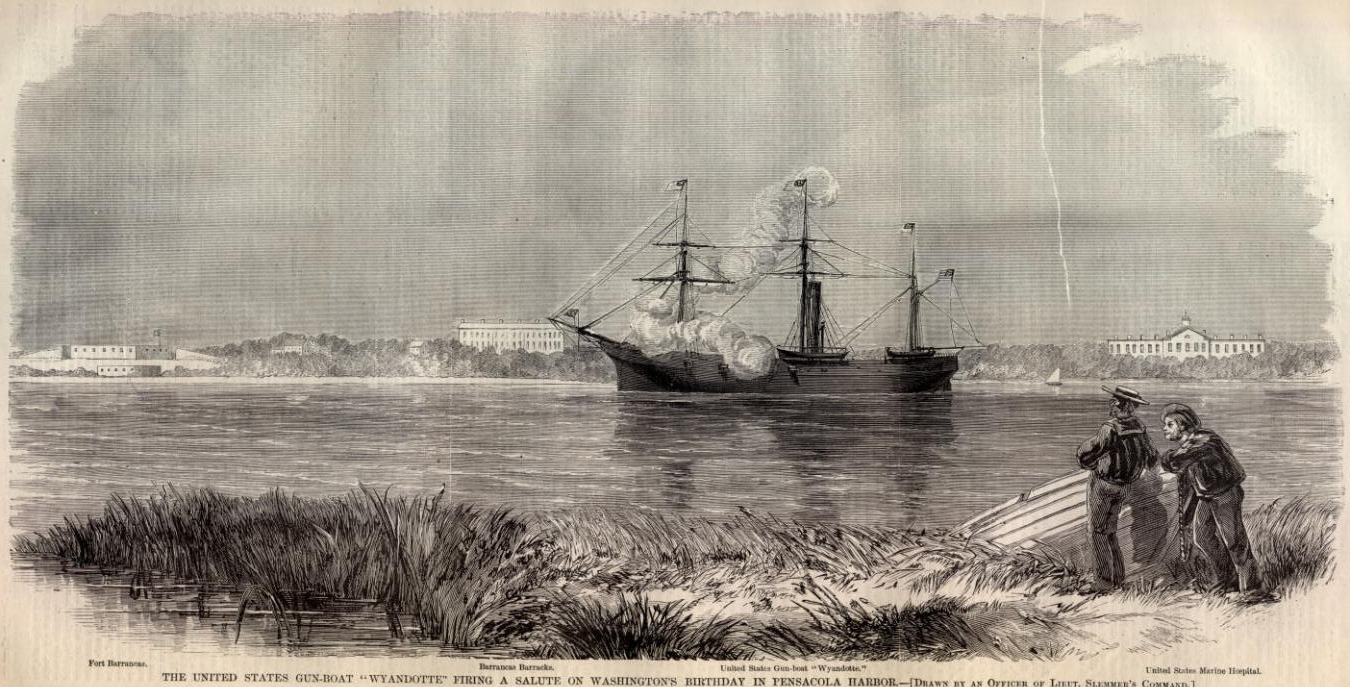
USS Wyandotte in Pensacola Harbor, 1861

== Post-war decommissioning ==
Wyandotte was decommissioned at the New York Navy Yard on 3 June 1865 and was sold at auction there on 12 July 1865. She was redocumented for merchant service on 23 September 1865, but was stranded when she ran aground off Duxbury, Massachusetts, on 26 January 1866 and was damaged beyond economical repair.
