= USS Mystic (1853) =

Gunboat of the United States Navy

History

United States
- Name: USS Memphis (1858–59); USS Mystic (1859–65)
- Ordered: as Mount Savage
- Launched: 1853
- Acquired: by charter, September 1858; Purchased, May 1859
- In service: 1858
- Out of service: 1865
- Fate: Sold, June 1865

General characteristics
- Displacement: 452 long tons (459 t)
- Propulsion: Steam engine; Screw-propelled
- Armament: 5 guns

USS Mystic was a steamer acquired by the U.S. Navy prior to the American Civil War when she was known as the USS Memphis and served in the Paraguay expedition of 1858 and 1859. During the American Civil War, she was used by the Union Navy as a gunboat in support of the Union Navy blockade of Confederate waterways.

== Service history ==
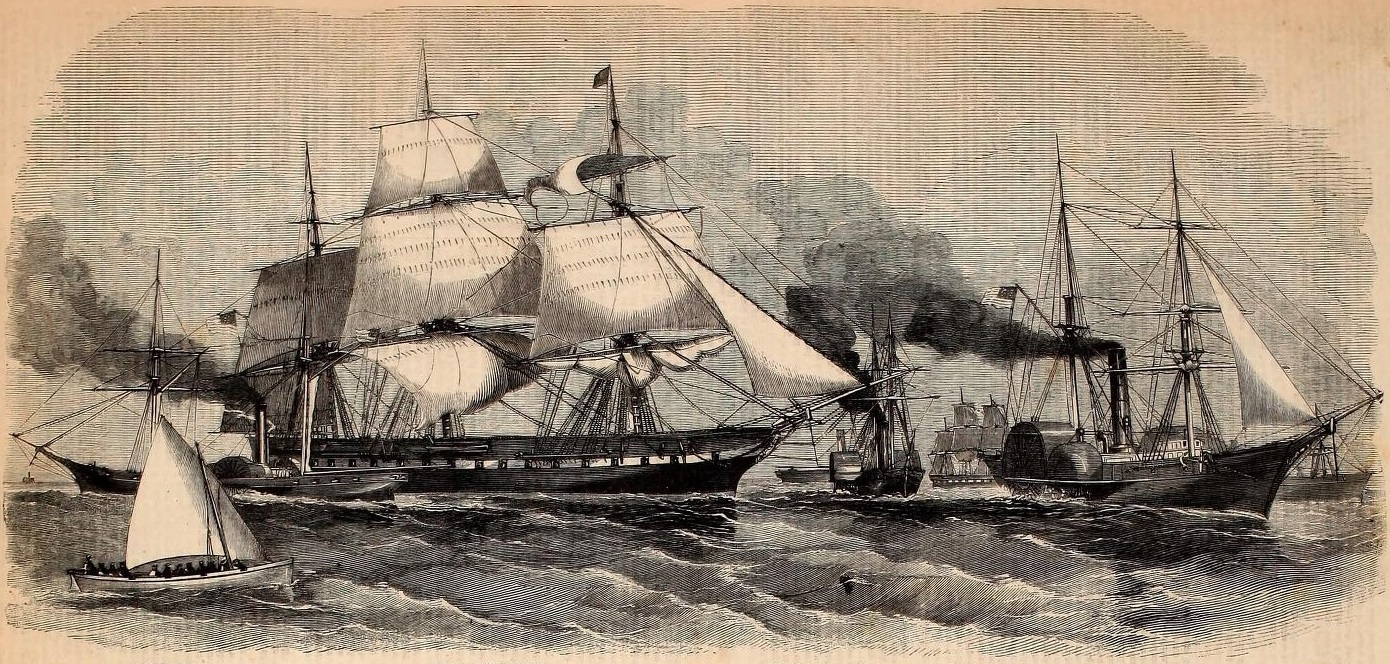
The Paraguay Squadron (Harper's Weekly, New York, October 16, 1858).

The ship was built as Mount Savage, a 452-ton (burden) screw steamship, in 1853 at Philadelphia, Pennsylvania. She was renamed Memphis in 1857. Chartered by the Navy in September 1858, she served as USS Memphis during the Paraguay expedition of late 1858 and early 1859. The steamer was purchased by the Navy in May 1859 and renamed USS Mystic a few weeks later. In June and July 1860, while operating off Africa, Mystic captured two slave ships.

During the first part of the Civil War Mystic served in the Union blockade of the Confederacy's Atlantic Ocean Coast. She assisted in the capture or destruction of four blockade runners off the coast of North Carolina in June–September 1862, among them the steamers Emma and Sunbeam. While in the process of taking the latter, on 28 September, she was damaged in collision with USS State of Georgia. In May 1863 she supported the Union Army during an expedition up the York River and in September of that year seized a sailing vessel off Yorktown, Virginia. Mystic was employed in the Chesapeake Bay region from late 1862 until the war's end. Mystic was sold to private owners in June 1865. Renamed General Custer, she disappeared from merchant vessel registers in 1868.
