= Walker Keith Armistead =

American military officer (1773-1845)

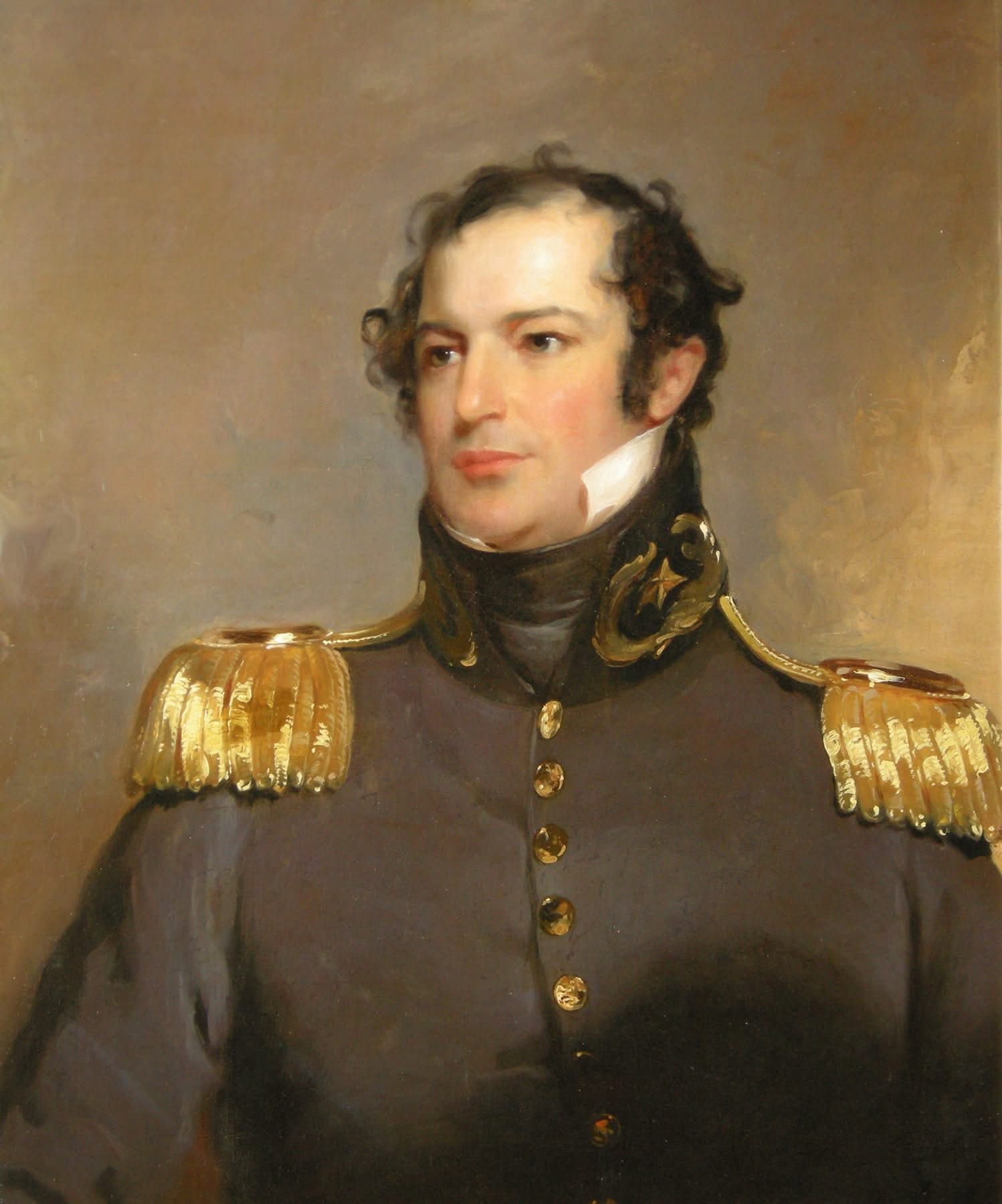
- Col. Walker Keith Armistead
- Born: 25 March 1773; New Market, Virginia, Colony of Virginia, British America
- Died: 13 October 1845 (aged 72); New Market, Virginia, U.S.
- Burial place: Armistead Family Cemetery; Upperville, Virginia, U.S.
- Children: Lewis Armistead
- Relatives: George Armistead (brother)
- Military career
- Allegiance: United States of America
- Branch: United States Army
- Service years: 1803–1845
- Rank: Colonel; Brevet Brigadier General
- Commands: 3rd Artillery Regiment; United States Army Corps of Engineers
- Conflicts: Northwest Indian War; War of 1812; Second Seminole War

Walker Keith Armistead (March 25, 1773 – October 13, 1845) was a military officer who served as Chief of Engineers of the United States Army Corps of Engineers.

Armistead was born in Upperville, Fauquier County, Virginia, and served as an orderly sergeant at the Battle of Fallen Timbers. He graduated from West Point in 1803. During the War of 1812, he was promoted to lieutenant colonel and successively served as Chief Engineer of the Niagara frontier army and the forces defending the Chesapeake Bay. He was promoted to colonel and Chief Engineer on November 12, 1818. When the Army was reorganized on June 1, 1821, he became commander of the 3rd Artillery Regiment. He was brevetted brigadier general in November 1828. He succeeded Zachary Taylor as commander of the army during the Second Seminole War against the Seminole Indians in Florida in 1840–1841.

After 42 years of service as a commissioned officer, Armistead died in New Market, Virginia, at the age of 72, and is buried in the Armistead family cemetery in Upperville.

== Family ==
His brother George Armistead commanded Fort McHenry during the Battle of Baltimore in the War of 1812. The attack became immortalized by onlooker Francis Scott Key who penned "The Star-Spangled Banner" while watching the British bombardment of Armistead's fort.

His son Lewis Addison Armistead was a Confederate general who died during Pickett's Charge at the Battle of Gettysburg in 1863.

Military offices
Preceded by Joseph Gardner Swift	Chief of Engineers; 1818–1821	Succeeded by Alexander Macomb, Jr.
