= William Gaston (disambiguation) =

William Gaston (1778–1844) was an American jurist and United States representative from North Carolina.

William Gaston may also refer to:

- William Gaston (merchant) (1785–1837), prominent citizen of Savannah, Georgia
- William Gaston (Massachusetts politician) (1820–1894), governor of Massachusetts
- William A. Gaston (1859–1927), American lawyer, banker, and gubernatorial candidate
- William H. Gaston (1840–1927), American landowner and Confederate soldier from Texas
- SS William Gaston, a World War II Liberty ship named after the North Carolina representative

== See also ==
- Bill Gaston (born 1953), Canadian novelist and playwright
- Willie Gaston (born 1982), American football player
