= John Hawks (architect) =

British-born American architect

- Born: c. 1731; Shipston-on-Stour, England
- Died: October 31, 1790 (aged about 59); New Bern, North Carolina, U.S.
- Occupation: Architect
- Spouse: Sarah Rice (m. 1768)
- Children: 2
- Buildings: Tryon Palace

John Hawks (c. 1731 – October 31, 1790) was an English-American architect active in the Province of North Carolina during the late colonial period. Born in Shipston-on-Stour, he worked under the Palladian architect Stiff Leadbetter. He accompanied William Tryon, the expectant governor of the Province of North Carolina, to New Bern in 1764. He was commissioned by Tryon to design and build Tryon Palace, a governor's mansion and assembly hall built from 1767 to 1770. He designed the St. Matthews Anglican Church in Hillsborough in 1768–1769, and drafted unbuilt designs for a church cupola and jail in Chowan County.

A number of other regional colonial buildings such as the Chowan County Courthouse, John Wright Stanly House, Coor-Bishop House, and Coor-Gaston House may have also been designed by Hawks, but no firm documentation exists. He served in various local government posts, including as the town commissioner of New Bern. During the American Revolution, he supported the Patriots. He served on the North Carolina Council of State from 1784 to 1786.

== Architectural career ==
Around 1731, John Hawks was born to the joiner John Hawks and his wife Elizabeth in Shipston-on-Stour, Warwickshire, England. He likely was trained in building by his father. He practiced architectural drawing and construction trade practices while working for Palladian architect Stiff Leadbetter, who designed and constructed a large number of country houses.

=== Tryon Palace ===
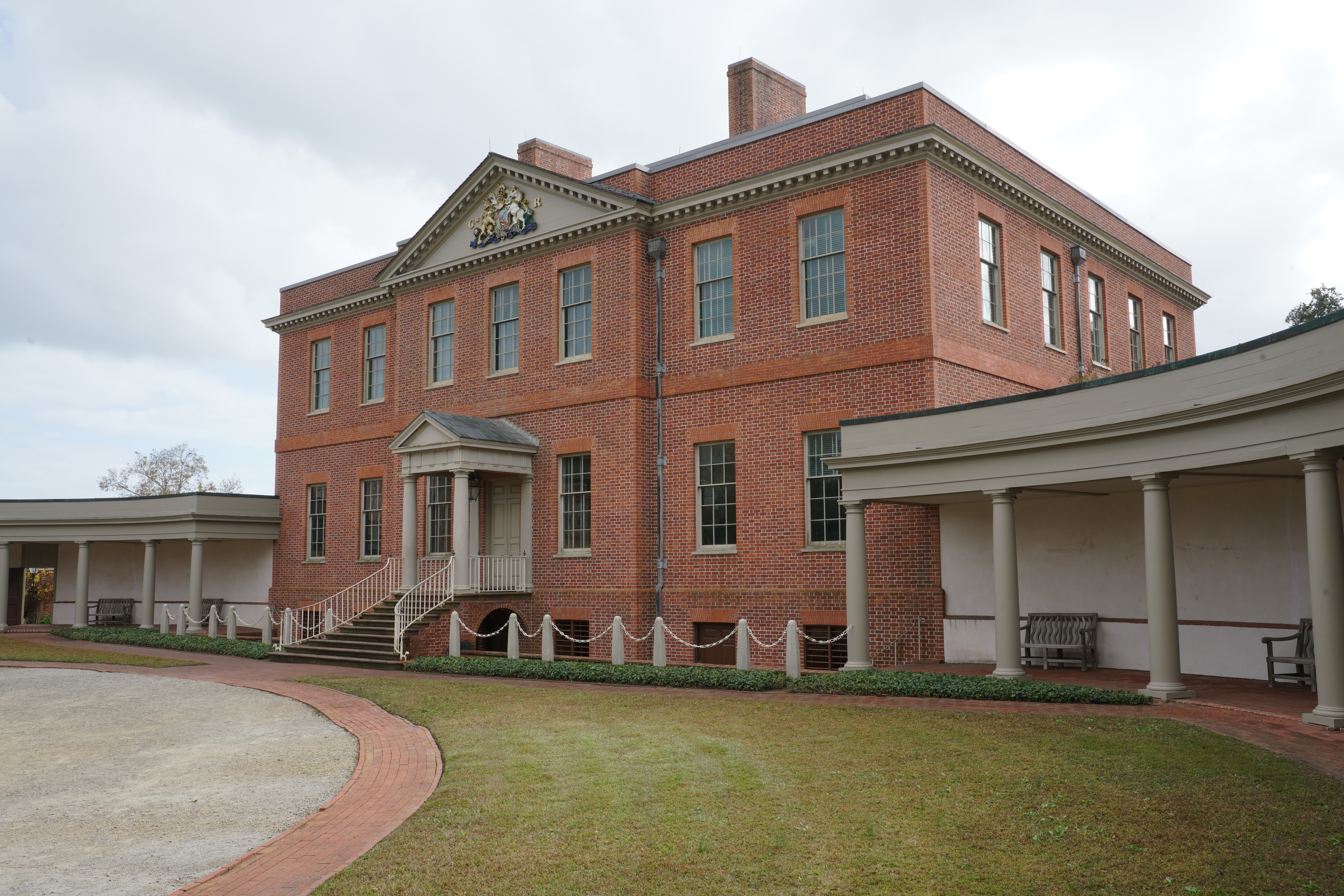
The reconstructed Tryon Palace in 2022

In 1764, William Tryon was appointed Lieutenant Governor of the Province of North Carolina. Expecting to soon succeed Arthur Dobbs as governor and organize building projects, he brought Hawks with him to the colony to serve as an architect. Tryon was not immediately promoted to governor as expected but assumed the position after Dobbs's death the following year. From 1766 to 1767, Hawks and Tryon worked to plan an "edifice", later dubbed Tryon Palace, in New Bern. The building would serve both as a governor's mansion and a meeting place for the North Carolina General Assembly. Hawks was the first professionally-trained architect to practice in North Carolina, as well as the first to reside permanently in the Thirteen Colonies.

A final plan was sent to England for approval in 1767. Hawks signed an agreement with Tryon in January 1767 to manage the construction, including surveying, supervision of the quality of construction materials, and the hiring and payment of workmen. Hawks was tasked to complete the structure within three years, and was promised two years of pay. Due to a lack of suitable construction workers in North Carolina, Hawks was dispatched to Philadelphia to hire workmen for the project. Construction on the building began in August 1767. By January 1769, the building had been roofed and plumbing had been installed. Following delays due to expenses – the construction cost three times its initial budget – it was completed in June 1770.

Taxes levied to fund the Tryon Palace construction were heavily opposed by the Regulators, who described it as overly extravagant. Alongside Claude J. Sauthier, Hawks was tasked to erect fortifications around New Bern to protect from the movement. He also constructed gun carriages during the conflict.

=== Later career ===
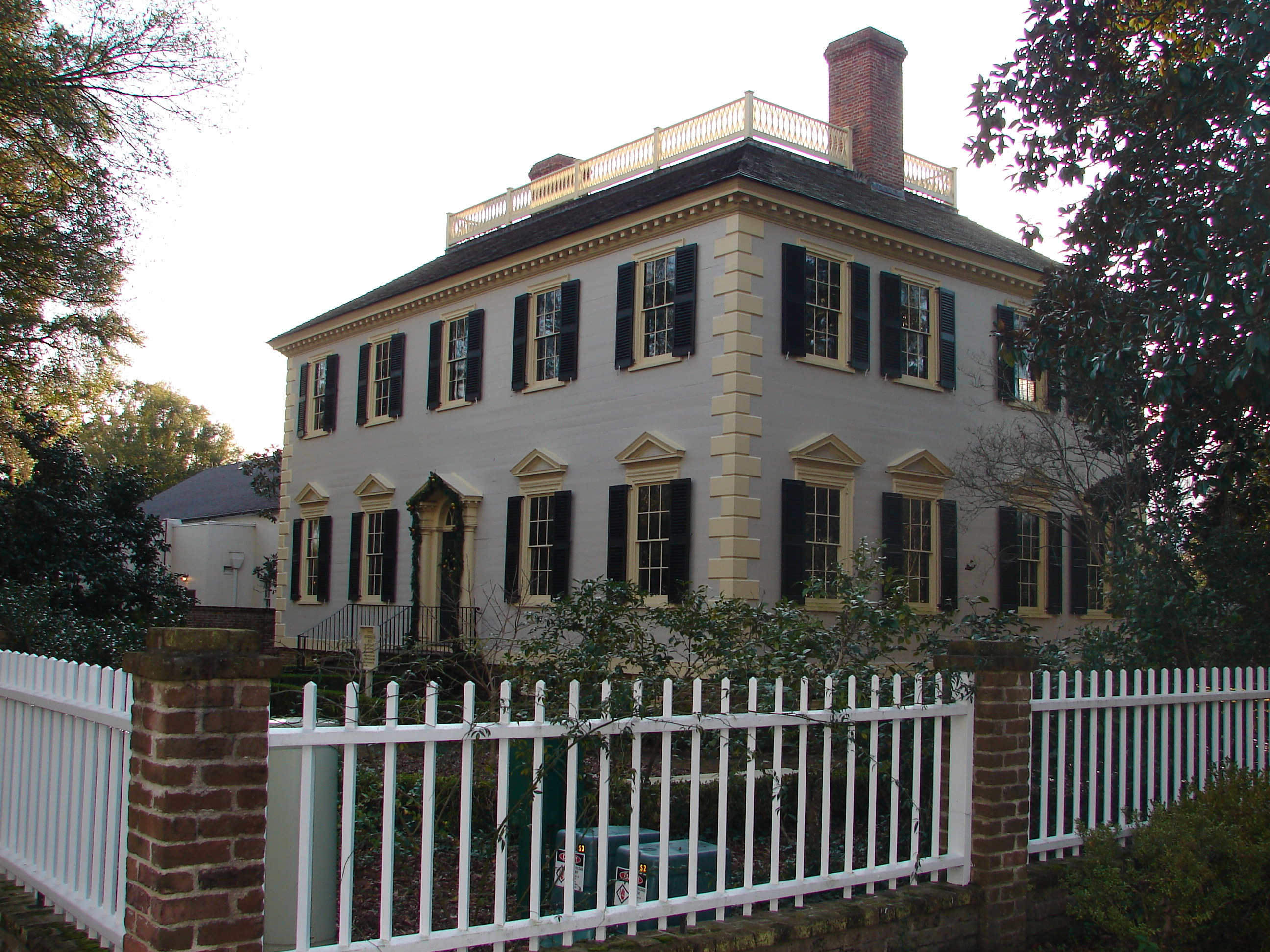
The John Wright Stanly House shows strong influence from Hawks, and may have been his creation.

Hawks was tasked to oversee repairs to the Craven County in 1766, and designed the St. Matthews Anglican Church in Hillsborough in 1768–1769. He stayed in New Bern after Tryon left the province in 1771, and continued to pursue local architectural commissions. He constructed a jail and jailer's residence for the county in 1771. Contemporary houses in New Bern such as the John Wright Stanly House, Coor-Bishop House, and Coor-Gaston House show strong similarities to his designs, and were likely designed by Hawks or someone influenced by him.

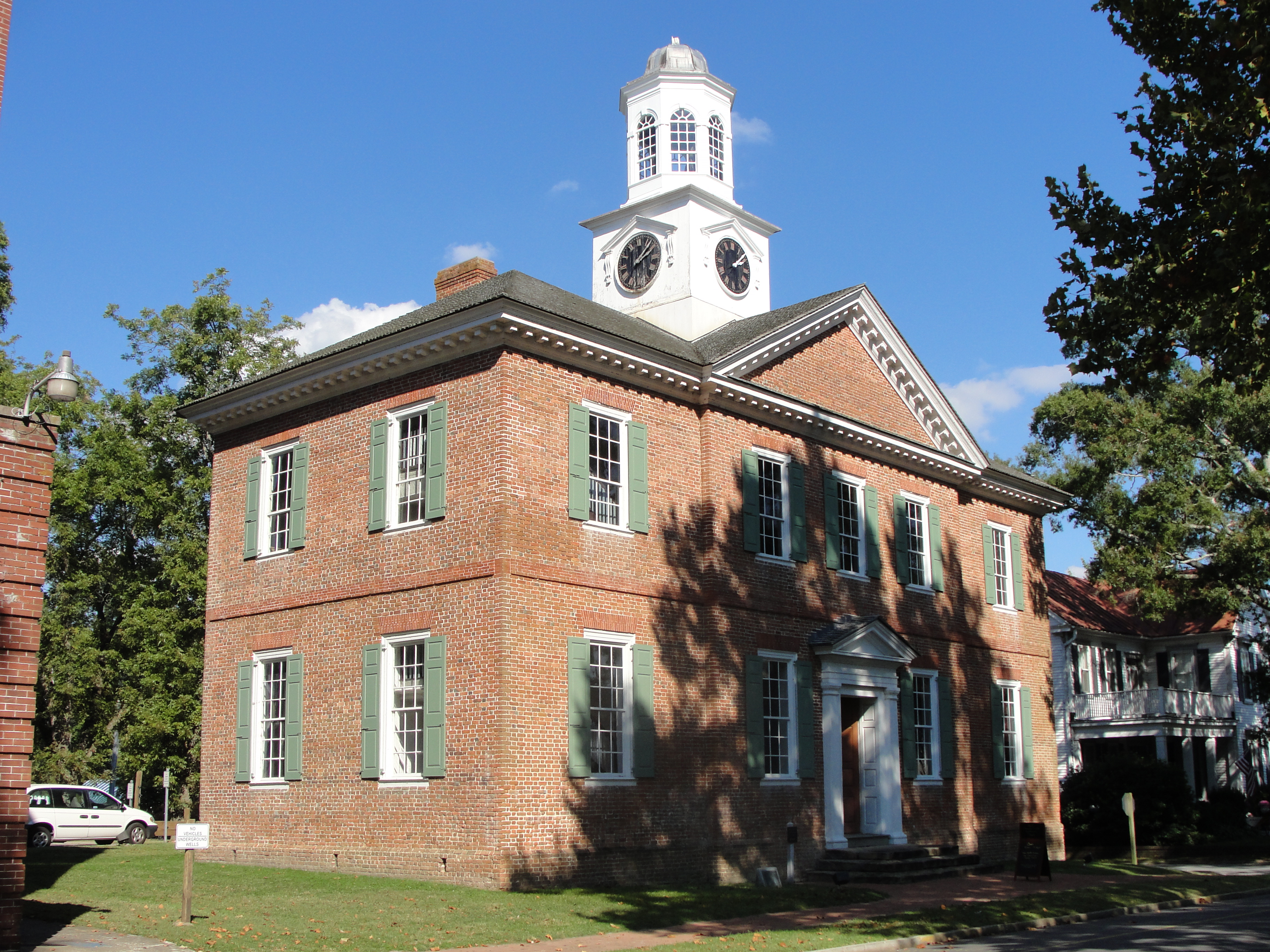
Hawks may have designed the Chowan County Courthouse.

Hawks may have designed the Chowan County Courthouse, which bears intense similarities to his Tryon Palace design. He drew up a plan for repairs to the courthouse's colonnade in 1773. He also drew plans for a cupola for St. Paul's Church in Edenton and the Chowan County jail; neither was built. Some sources attribute churches built around Granville County in 1771 to Hawks, but no documentation of such exists.

== Political career ==
In October 1766, Hawks became the macebearer of the upper house of the North Carolina Assembly. Tryon appointed him the customs collector for the port of Beaufort the following year. On Tryon's recommendation, his successor Josiah Martin appointed Hawks the clerk of the North Carolina council from 1773 to 1774.

During the early 1770s, Hawks served variously as the town commissioner, clerk of the town council, and justice of the peace in New Bern. He supported the Patriots during the American Revolution, and later served on the North Carolina Council of State from 1784 to 1786; he served as the council's president in 1785. Hawks served for almost a decade as a district auditor. In December 1788, he was appointed the judge of the mercantile court for the New Bern District; he resigned the following month, stating that he did not feel qualified.

== Personal life ==
Hawks married Sarah Rice, a member of a New Bern planter family and the granddaughter of Nathaniel Rice, in 1769. They had two sons, Samuel and Francis. His grandson, Francis L. Hawks, was a prominent priest and historian. After several years of gout, John Hawks died in New Bern on October 31, 1790.
