= Quaker trusteeship =

19th-century method of freeing slaves in the US

In the early nineteenth century, Quakers in North Carolina used trusts to free slaves. At the time, North Carolina had adopted laws restricting the ability of slaveowners to free their slaves. To get around these laws individual Quakers began entrusting their slaves to their church. The Quaker organization held on to the slaves in conditions of virtual freedom, until it could obtain the legal freedom of the slave. While this method of freeing slaves was initially popular, the practice fell into disuse as a result of demographic and political reasons.

== Background ==
During the eighteenth century, the North Carolina General Assembly adopted tight restrictions on manumission. In 1723, the Assembly prohibited slave owners from freeing their slaves, unless as a reward for "meritorious service". This restriction was reaffirmed in 1741, 1777 and finally in 1796. By the beginning of the nineteenth century it was the most restrictive law of its kind in the states of the Upper South. As a result of these restrictive policies many North Carolinians interested in emancipation, especially Quakers, made active attempts to circumvent the law by emancipating their slaves. The Quakers of North Carolina committed themselves to rid their community of slave ownership. At the 1782 Yearly Meeting, the leaders of the community required their members to emancipate all their slaves. This policy of manumission ran into direct conflict with the laws of North Carolina. As a result, the Quakers actively sought a way to emancipate slaves.

== Using trusts to emancipate ==
=== Adoption of trustee device ===
In 1808 many North Carolinians were using trusts as a way to manumit slaves without breaking North Carolina's restrictive laws. A master simply entrusted his or her slave to a trustee, who was responsible for providing the slave with his or her freedom. The trust would specify the manner by which the trustee could fulfill his or her obligations. Some trusts required the trustee to remove the slave to a state with less restrictive manumission laws and where the slave could be formally emancipated. Others required the trustee to free the slave in North Carolina by proving "meritorious service" in the proper court. Finally, many trusts required the trustee to hold the slave until North Carolina law permitted emancipation. The end goal of all these efforts was to avoid improper manumission and the possibility of re-enslavement.

At the 1808 Yearly Meeting the Quakers decided to use trusts to collect slaves. A 1796, statute passed by the General Assembly, permitted religious organizations to appoint trustees to hold for the congregation any real estate and donations "of whatever kind". The Quakers interpreted this to include the holding of slaves in trust. To support this conclusion, the North Carolina Friends asked the respected jurist, William Gaston for his legal opinion. According to Gaston, the "donations of property such as money, slaves, etc., may be received to any amount – such donations can not be set aside by any persons claiming under the donors, nor can they be impaired by anyone." The Quakers, on the basis of this interpretation, appointed a number of trustees to accept donations of slaves from owners seeking to free their slaves.

=== Results ===
Over the next twenty years, the Quakers successfully used trusts to hold and free a number of slaves. By 1814 they held nearly 350 slaves in trust. A decade later the numbers held increased to over 500 slaves. At the apex of this program, in 1826, the Quakers held 600 slaves in trust. Individual Quakers from all over North Carolina gave their slaves to the Quaker established trusts. Some members went further, purchasing slaves from non-Quakers for the Society to hold in trust. Even some non-Quakers sought to assign their slaves to the Quaker trusts. The latter practice so worried the Quaker leadership that they prohibited it at the 1822 Yearly Meeting.

Trustees fulfilled their obligations by granting entrusted slaves virtual freedom or transporting them to a state where freedom was available. Slaves held in trust in North Carolina often earned their own wages, ran their own families and owned their own property. Quakers also opened schools for these quasi-freedmen as early as 1816. Trustees sent other slaves to governments where the slave could be freed without violating the law. Popular destinations for entrusted slaves were Pennsylvania, Indiana, Illinois and Ohio.

== Board of Trustees v. Dickinson ==
Quakers use of trusts proceeded unimpeded until 1829 when the issue came before the North Carolina Supreme Court. At issue in Trustees of the Quaker Society of Contentnea v. William Dickinson was an 1817 entrustment of a slave owned by William Dickinson to the Quakers of Contentnea. The terms of the conveyance required the Quakers to hold the slave in North Carolina until he could be freed in accordance with the laws of the State. While held, the slave was permitted to earn an income.

The majority opinion, written by Judge Taylor denied the ability of the Quakers to hold slaves in trust. Taylor narrowly interpreted the 1796 law allowing religious organizations to hold property in trust. The law, he concluded, only allowed a religious organization to hold property for its own benefit, not for the benefit or "other persons". The Quakers, Taylor noted, harbored a religious and moral aversion to slavery, and sought slaves only to rid humanity of the sin of slave ownership. He further noted that the slaves held in trust were slaves in name only, and were given extensive freedoms. These facts lead him to conclude that the trust was, in reality, for the benefit of the slaves. He, therefore, rejected the ability of Quakers to hold slaves in trust for the purpose of freeing them in state.

The majority opinion also made note of the consequences of these trusts, if the Court found them valid. While freely admitting the right of individuals to hold slaves and do with them as they wished, the Court rejected the Quakers' actions as "fraudulent". The Court warned that "mischief" would ensue if those actions were upheld. According to Judge Taylor, the quasi-emancipated individuals working for their own benefit in sight of the enslaved "would naturally excite in the latter discontent with their condition, encourage idleness and disobedience, and lead possibly in the course of human events to the most calamitous of all contests, a bellum servile (slave revolt)." As a result, he concluded, the "duty of self-preservation" required the court overturn the law.

In dissent, Judge Hall found that statute and its application clear. All that was required of any person or incorporated society claiming use of some property was a title proclaiming their rights in that property. He argued that nothing in the 1796 law or in Quaker doctrine prohibited the possession of slaves. He countered the majority's self-preservation argument by noting that that consideration was for the legislature to decide.

== Declining use ==
The decision prohibited Quaker trusts from holding slaves in North Carolina under conditions of virtual freedom. Subsequent decisions in the North Carolina Supreme Court reinforced this decision. The court did not, however, prohibit the use of trusts for the express purpose of sending slaves to be emancipated in other states; rather its major concern was with the conditions of virtual freedom given to slaves held in trust in the state. As a result, those Quakers still committed to the emancipation of slaves increasingly sent their entrusted slaves to northern states or states with lenient laws against manumission.

Nevertheless, the practice of Quaker trusteeships fell into disuse by the 1830s. This decline occurred for a number of reasons. First, significant portions of the Quaker population migrated from North Carolina west to states like Ohio, thereby diminishing the political clout and anti-slavery passions of the community. Second, the prevailing attitude towards slavery in the South generally and North Carolina specifically changed drastically in the half century preceding the Civil War. As a result, there was increased political support for enforcing the restrictive policies against manumission. While some individual North Carolinians and Quakers continued to use trusts as means of freeing their slaves, the organized community has largely abandoned such efforts in the 1830s.
