= Christ Episcopal Church and Parish House (New Bern, North Carolina) =

Historic church in North Carolina, United States

- U.S. National Register of Historic Places
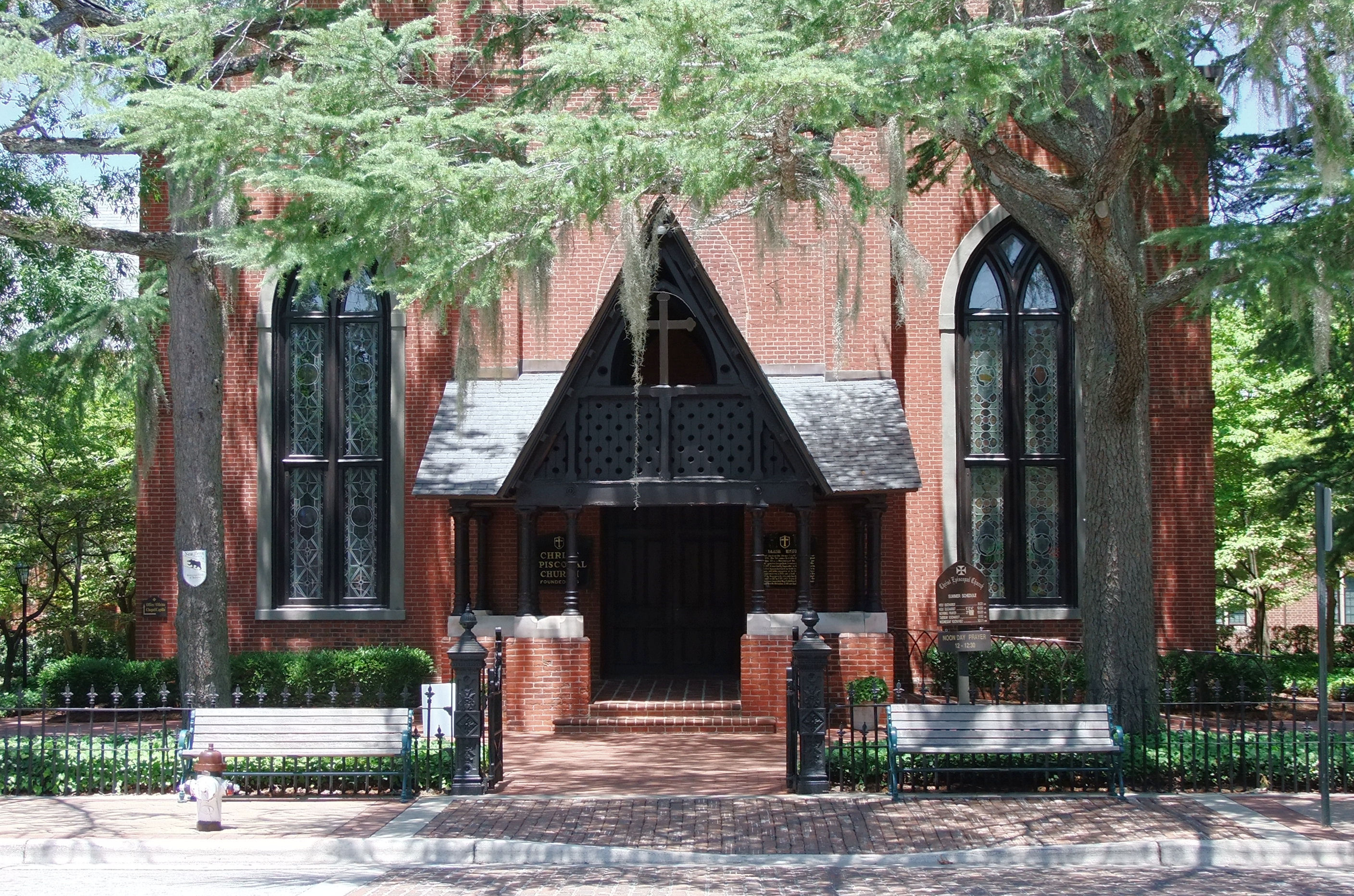

- Location within North Carolina Location within the United States
- Location: 320 Pollock St., New Bern, North Carolina
- Coordinates: 35°6′25″N 77°2′23″W
- Area: 0.8 acres (0.32 ha)
- Built: 1824, 1871, 1884, 1904-1908
- Architect: Flanner, Bennett; Simpson, Herbert W.
- Architectural style: Gothic, Gothic Revival
- Website: https://www.christchurchnewbern.com/
- NRHP reference No.: 73001320
- Added to NRHP: April 13, 1973

Christ Episcopal Church and Parish House is a historic Episcopal church located at 320 Pollock Street in New Bern, Craven County, North Carolina. It was built in 1871, incorporating the brick shell of the previous church built in 1824. It is a brick church building in a restrained Gothic Revival style. The original brickwork of the nave is laid in Flemish bond. It features a three-stage entrance tower, with a pyramidal roof and octagonal spire. Beneath the tower is a Stick Style entrance porch added in 1884. The parish house was built between 1904 and 1908, and is a two-story, three bay by five bay, rectangular red brick building with a steep slate gable roof.

A five-piece communion service, the gift of George II, is on secure display in the church when not in use. There is a chalice, paten/cover, two flagons, and a basin for receiving the offering. All pieces bear the royal arms and are completely hallmarked for London, 1752, maker Mordecai Fox.

It was listed on the National Register of Historic Places in 1973.

== History ==
The beginnings of Christ Episcopal Church date back to the Vestry Act of 1715, which established Craven Parish encompassing the New Bern area. Craven Parish, was further divided in 1741, resulting in the creation of Christ Church Parish. Sometime before 1751, the current property was "saved" for a church, and any church constructed by the congregation sat on that property. The first church building was completed around 1750 and served as the only place of worship in New Bern at that time. The Church of England was disestablished in North Carolina with the first state constitution in 1776. Following the death of the long-time rector, the Reverend James Reed, in 1777, there was no full-time rector at Christ Episcopal Church until 1785. In 1778, the corner of Pollock and Middle streets had been the designated starting point for a new survey of the town. At that spot, John Wright Stanly, a member of the church, gifted a canon from the British ship Lady Blessington, which had been captured during the revolution by an armed privateer owned by Stanly. The Protestant Episcopal Church in the United States of America was established in 1785, and the Episcopal Diocese of North Carolina was established in 1817. This new diocese included New Bern and, as a result, Christ Episcopal Church. A new church building was proposed in 1820 to be made of brick in the center of the church lot. The roof placed on the structure in 1824 proved too heavy for the walls, necessitating extensive repairs in 1833. The roof was removed, the walls were straightened, and a new roof made of cypress shingles replaced the previous one.

The city of New Bern and subsequently Christ Episcopal Church were captured early in the American Civil War by Union Forces. The day after the capture, General Ambrose Burnside ordered all the churches, including Christ Episcopal, in the city to be opened with military chaplains officiating. The churches of New Bern were used extensively by the Union during the war.

In 1871, a fire ignited across the street and spread to the cypress roof, causing the church to burn, leaving only the brick walls and the base of the tower intact. A new church was completed in 1875 using what remained of the walls from the 1824 church. This new church was consecrated on May 23, 1875, though the steeple was not completed until 1885. In 1883, the Episcopal Diocese of North Carolina voted to split off the eastern portion into a new diocese, the Episcopal Diocese of East Carolina, thereby placing Christ Episcopal under its jurisdiction. The Stick Style porch was added in 1884. The parish house, designed by Herbert W. Simpson, began construction in 1904 and was completed in 1908. The chancel was remodeled and enlarged in 1914.

== Notable Burials ==
- James Reed, the first rector of the church
- Charles Elliot, attorney general of the colony
- John Wright Stanly, revolutionary war patriot and former owner of the John Wright Stanly House
