= SS William Gaston =

World War II Liberty ship of the United States

History

United States
- Name: William Gaston
- Namesake: William Gaston
- Builder: North Carolina Shipbuilding Company, Wilmington, North Carolina
- Yard number: 15
- Way number: 3
- Laid down: 23 May 1942
- Launched: 19 July 1942
- Acquired: 5 August 1942
- Fate: Sunk by U-861, 23 July 1944

General characteristics
- Type: Liberty ship
- Tonnage: 7,000 long tons deadweight (DWT)
- Length: 441 ft 6 in (134.57 m)
- Beam: 56 ft 11 in (17.35 m)
- Draft: 27 ft 9 in (8.46 m)
- Propulsion: Two oil-fired boilers; Triple expansion steam engine; Single screw; 2,500 hp (1,864 kW)
- Speed: 11 knots (20 km/h; 13 mph)
- Capacity: 9,140 tons cargo
- Complement: 41
- Armament: 1 × 5 in (130 mm) deck gun, 1 x 3-inch/50-caliber gun, and 8 x .30 caliber machine guns

SS William Gaston (MC contract 159) was a Liberty ship built in the United States during World War II. She was named after William Gaston, member of the U.S. House of Representatives from North Carolina, author of the North Carolina state song, and namesake of Gaston County, North Carolina.

The ship was laid down by North Carolina Shipbuilding Company in their Cape Fear River yard on May 23, 1942, then launched on July 19, 1942. She was operated by the American West Africa Line for the War Shipping Administration.

On July 23, 1944, while traveling between Buenos Aires, Argentina and Baltimore, Maryland Gaston was torpedoed by the German submarine U-861. Two torpedoes struck the vessel ten minutes apart. Gaston rolled over and sank three minutes after the second torpedo without loss of life. The survivors were picked up on July 25, 1944, by USS Matagorda and taken to Florianópolis, Brazil.
