= Tryon Palace =

Historic property and museum in North Carolina, United States

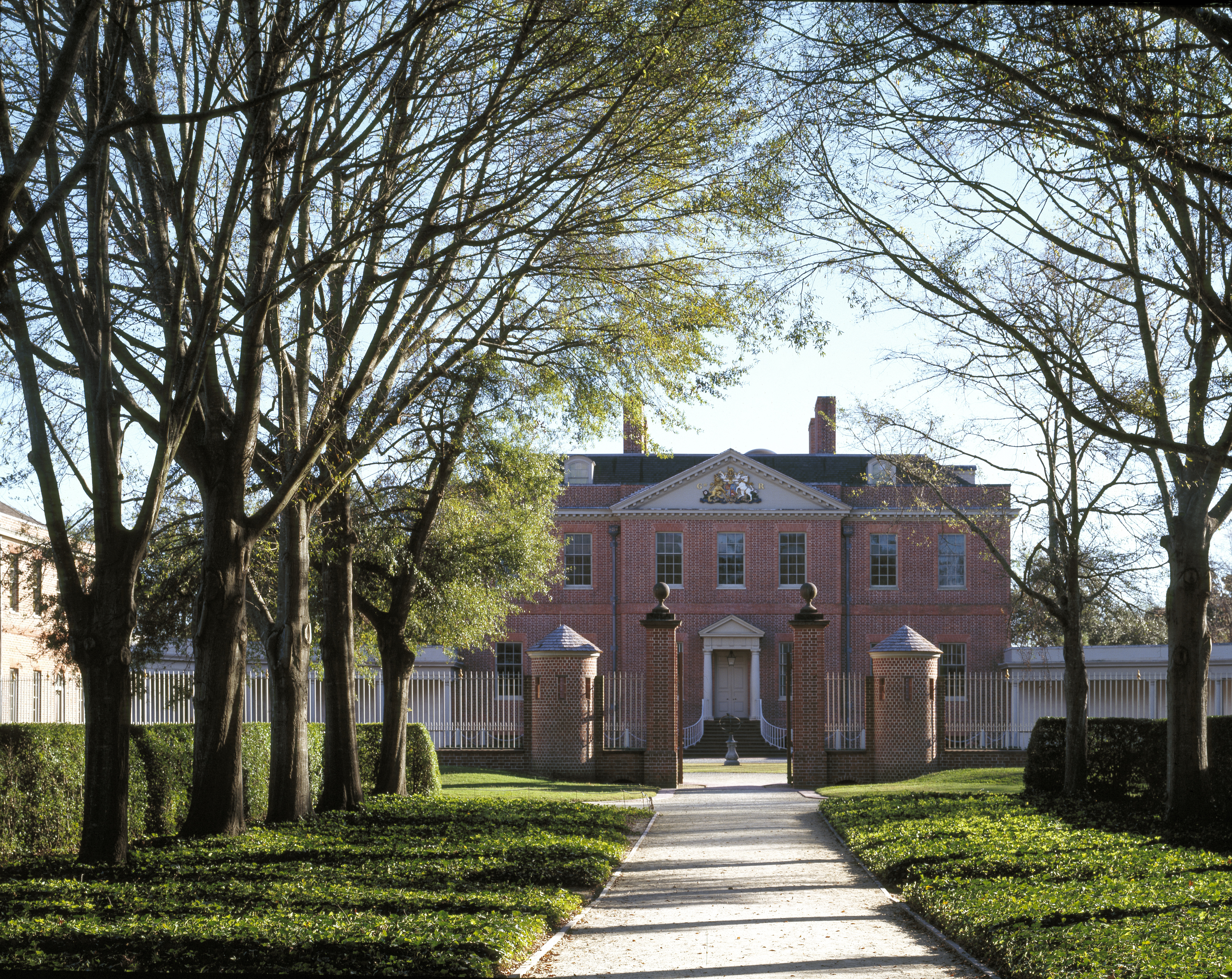
- Main façade of Tryon Palace

- Location within North Carolina
- Former names: Governor's House, Newbern; Governor's Palace, Newbern

General information
- Status: Rebuilt, used as a house museum
- Architectural style: Georgian
- Location: 529 South Front Street, New Bern, North Carolina, United States
- Coordinates: 35°06′20.9″N 77°02′39.5″W
- Year built: 1952–1959
- Opened: April 8, 1959
- Owner: Government of North Carolina
- Operator: North Carolina Department of Natural and Cultural Resources

Technical details
- Floor count: 2

Website
- tryonpalace.org

Tryon Palace, also called the Governor's House and the Governor's Palace, is a two-story building located in the eastern part of New Bern, North Carolina. The building is a faithful reconstruction of the original 1770 residence built by architect John Hawks. The original building was destroyed by fire in 1798.

Serving as the official residence and offices of the British governors of North Carolina from 1770 until the American Revolution, the original building was seized by provincial militia in 1775. The palace was the site of the first few sessions of the state legislature following the 1783 treaty of Paris that ended the American Revolutionary War, and served as the state house until 1792 when the capital was relocated to Raleigh.

The rebuilt building was erected on the original palace grounds in the 1950s and opened to the public as a house museum in 1959. The 18th century gardens were also recreated, with 16 acres (6.5 ha) of plantings, representing three centuries of landscape and gardening heritage. Today, it is a state-owned historic site.

== Background ==
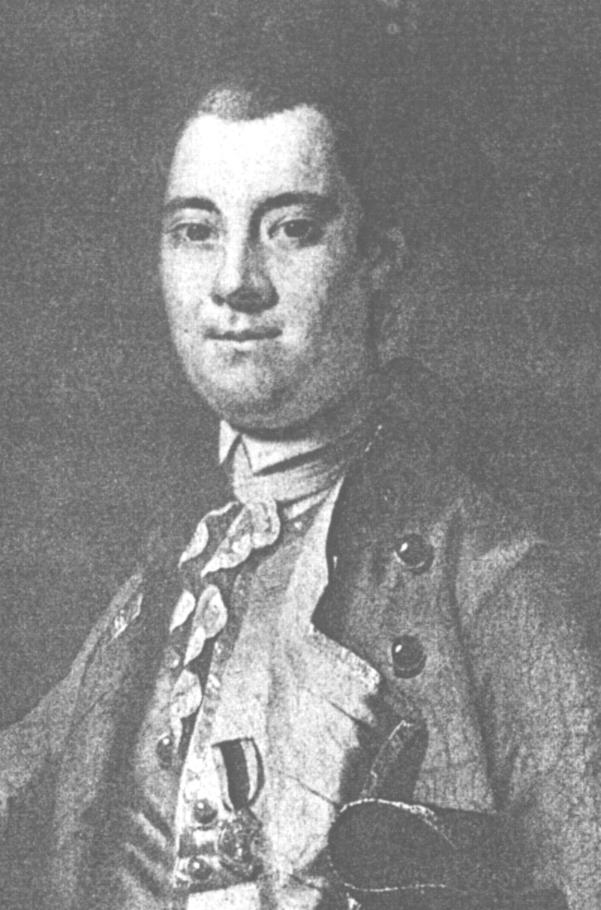
Alleged portrait of William Tryon, the first governor to reside in New Bern, moved into the original building in 1770. There are no known authentic portraits of the eighth British governor.

William Tryon was a British officer and colonial official who served as the governor of North-Carolina from 1765 to 1771. Tryon had seen the need for a centrally located Government House while lieutenant governor. After assuming office Governor Tryon worked with architect John Hawks to draw up plans for a government house similar to other British colonial structures of the time. In December 1766, the North Carolina legislature authorized £5,000 for the building of an "Edifice".

Tryon told the legislature that the sum was not substantial enough for the plans he and Hawks had created; building it "in the plainest manner" would cost no less than £10,000 without including the outbuildings he envisioned. Hawks agreed to supervise the construction for three years and went to Philadelphia at Tryon's behest to hire workers; Tryon said native North Carolina workers would not know how to construct such a building. Tryon was able to convince the legislature to increase taxes for the house.

In 1770 Tryon and his wife, Margaret Wake, moved into the Palace; at the time, "palace" was a standard word for any public building of this type. The house was "a monument of opulence and elegance extraordinary in the American colonies."

The cost of the building exacted great controversy in the North Carolina backcountry where most viewed it as an unnecessary, extravagant display of England. Extra taxation to fund the project had been levied by the governor on the citizens of the province, who had already felt overburdened with taxation. It proved to be too much and served as a major catalyst in North Carolina's War of the Regulation; which culminated in the Battle of Alamance on May 16, 1771, and later led to the hanging of seven men. The unpopular Tryon left North Carolina on June 30, 1771, to become Governor of New York on July 8 of that year. He had only lived in the house a little more than a year. Oddly, Fort Tryon Park in Upper Manhattan has also retained its name even though William Tryon had served so very briefly as the last governor of New York province.

In May 1775, when the American Revolutionary War began, Governor Josiah Martin fled the mansion. Rebels seized the Palace and retained it as their seat of government. The new state's first general assemblies were held there and many of the furnishings were auctioned off to fund its administration. North Carolina was admitted to the newly formed United States in 1789. Three years later, the North Carolina State House was built in Raleigh as the state capitol. Four state governors lived in the palace – Richard Caswell, Abner Nash, Alexander Martin, and U.S. Founding Father Richard Dobbs Spaight.

The Palace was subsequently used for several different purposes, including a school, a boarding house, and a Masonic lodge. A cellar fire started in 1798, consuming the Palace proper. Only the Kitchen and Stable Offices were saved. However, the Kitchen Office was razed at the beginning of the 19th century. Of the original buildings, only the Stable Office still stands.

== Construction ==
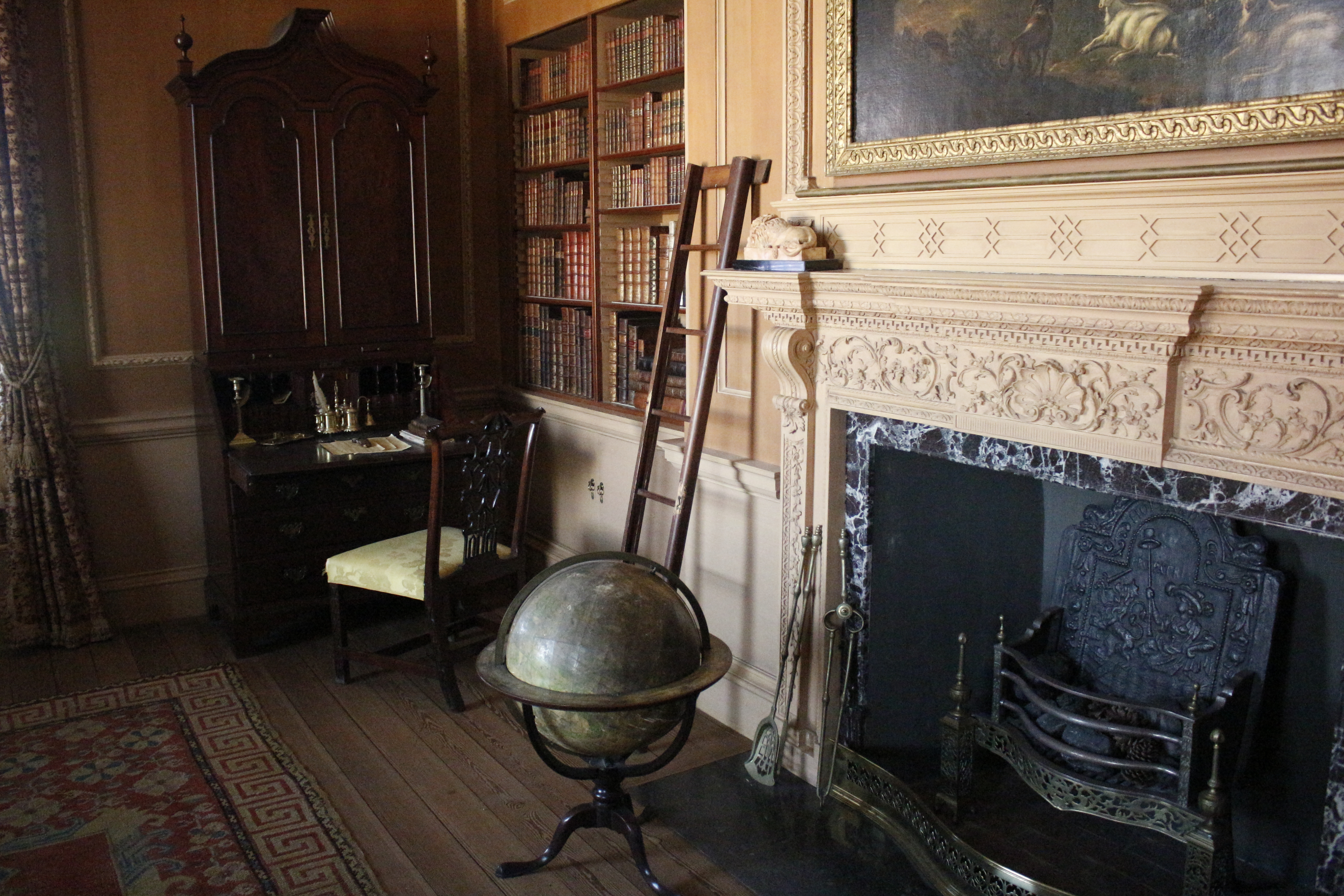
Governor's library

In the 1930s, a movement began to preserve Colonial New Bern. The movement was bolstered by the discovery of the original Palace plans. Mrs. James Edwin Latham, a New Bern native, asked the state to assist the restoration efforts in 1944 and opened a trust fund committed purely to restoring the Palace. The North Carolina General Assembly organized the Tryon Palace Commission in 1945. This Commission consisted of 25 people appointed by the governor, with the task of rebuilding the Palace using the original plans. The state agreed to be responsible for the Palace once it opened to the public.

Mrs. Latham did not live to see the rebuilding of the Palace. After her death in 1951, her daughter Mae Gordon Kellenberger oversaw the efforts. The first obstacles to overcome were moving as many as 50 or more buildings, rerouting U.S. Highway 70, and building a new bridge over the Trent River. These structures covered the foundations of the original building. Archaeological work also had to be done before construction could begin. Once it did, craftspeople from all over the United States were recruited. There were also visits to the United Kingdom to procure period-accurate furniture. Finally, the public was able to visit it for the first time in 1959.

== The site ==
=== The Palace ===
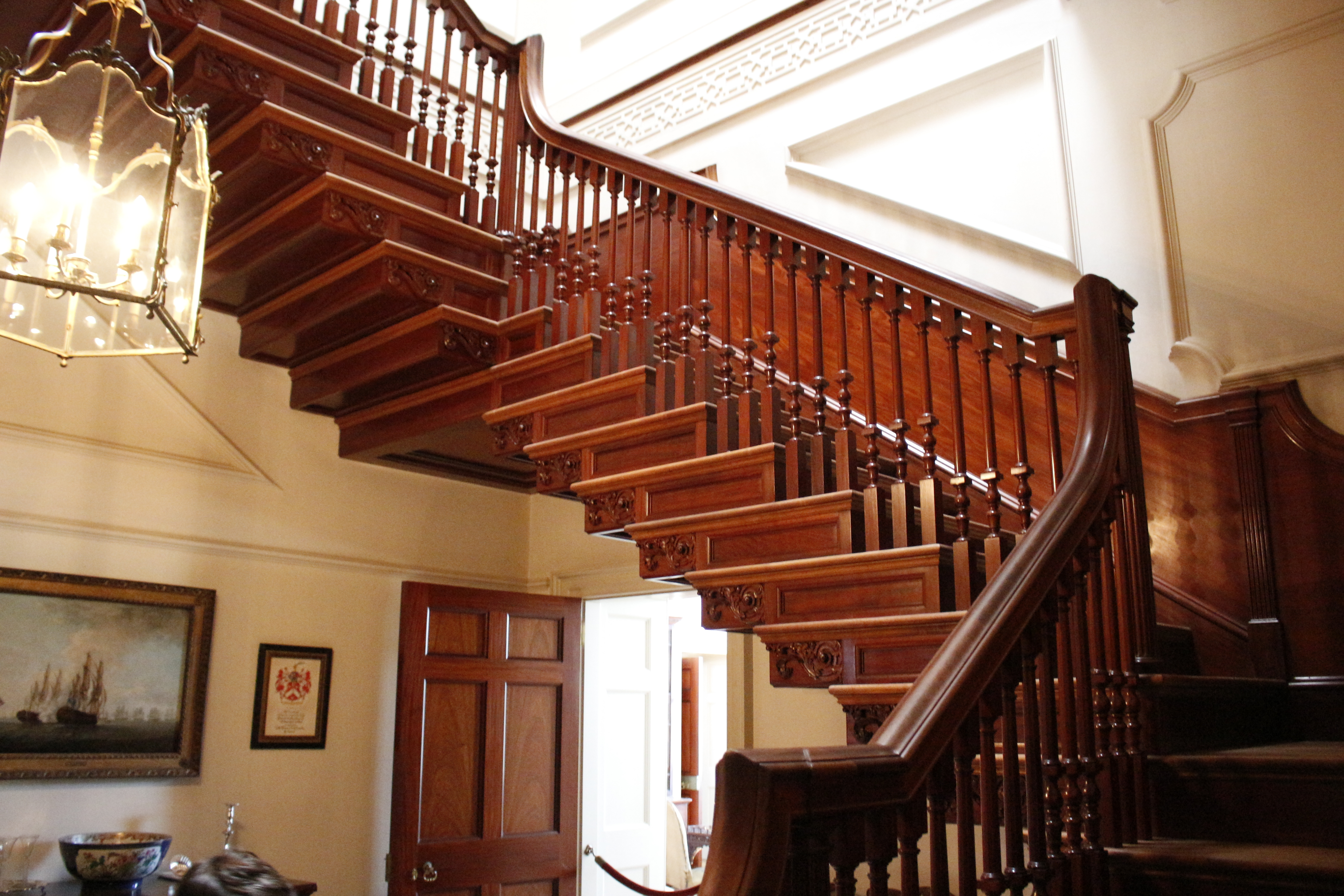
Grand staircase

The Tryon Palace Historic Site includes several structures besides the main building. The Stable Offices is the only original structure still standing. The Kitchen Office is separate from the Palace, as was usual at the time. After the 1798 fire, the grounds were divided into lots and sold. In the early 1830s, a house (George W. Dixon House) was built for George W. Dixon, a wealthy merchant tailor and former mayor of New Bern. The Robert Hay House, built at the start of the 19th century, was purchased in 1816 by Robert Hay, a Scottish immigrant and wainwright. The John Wright Stanly House is an outstanding example of Georgian architecture and has served as home to several generations of his family, some of whom were important figures during the American Revolution, the early national period, and the Civil War. The New Bern Academy was the first school in North Carolina established by legal mandate, in 1766. Like the Palace, the original academy building was destroyed by fire, this one in 1795. The current structure was built between 1806 and 1809.

=== Gardens ===
The Palace's 16 acres (65,000 m^{2}) of gardens span three centuries of gardening history. Anchored by 20th-century Colonial Revival interpretations of earlier periods, these also include an 18th-century Wilderness Garden featuring native plants that greeted the first European settlers in this area and lush displays favored by the Victorians.

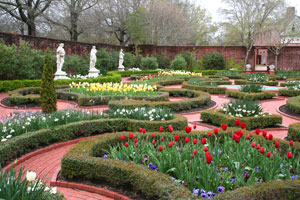
Palace garden

While Governor Tryon seems to have had little interest in horticulture, two maps of New Bern drawn by Claude J. Sauthier in 1769, when the Palace was still under construction, reveal two different garden plans.

More than two centuries later, in 1991, Palace researchers discovered yet another plan. In the collections of the Academia Nacional de la Historia in Venezuela they found a garden plan Palace architect John Hawks gave to Venezuelan traveler Francisco de Miranda, who admired the Palace greatly when he visited New Bern in 1783. This plan suggests a strong French influence instead of the more-to-be-expected English garden style.

It is likely the work of Sauthier, who was born in France in 1736 and trained as a draftsman. In 1763 he wrote a Treatis on Public Architecture and Garden Planning that reflects a strong influence of two 18th-century French master gardeners, one of whom trained with the designer of Versailles.

Sauthier came to America before the Revolution to work as a mapmaker. In 1768, Governor Tryon employed him to draw a series of North Carolina town maps, including one of New Bern. Similarities of style between the town maps and the garden plan discovered in Venezuela suggest that Sauthier created them all.

None of the historic garden plans has ever been implemented at the Palace. The current gardens were designed by Morley Williams at the time of the Palace Restoration. Before undertaking the Palace project, Williams had served on the faculties of Harvard and North Carolina State Universities and assisted in the restoration of the gardens at Mount Vernon and Stratford Hall. His designs are in the colonial revival style that was widely employed in the mid-20th century.

With the opening of the North Carolina History Center in 2010, the gardens now include an area filled with a diversity of riparian plants native to the river edges of coastal North Carolina. These survive both in flood and drought, and provide food and shelter for a variety of wildlife

=== Museum ===
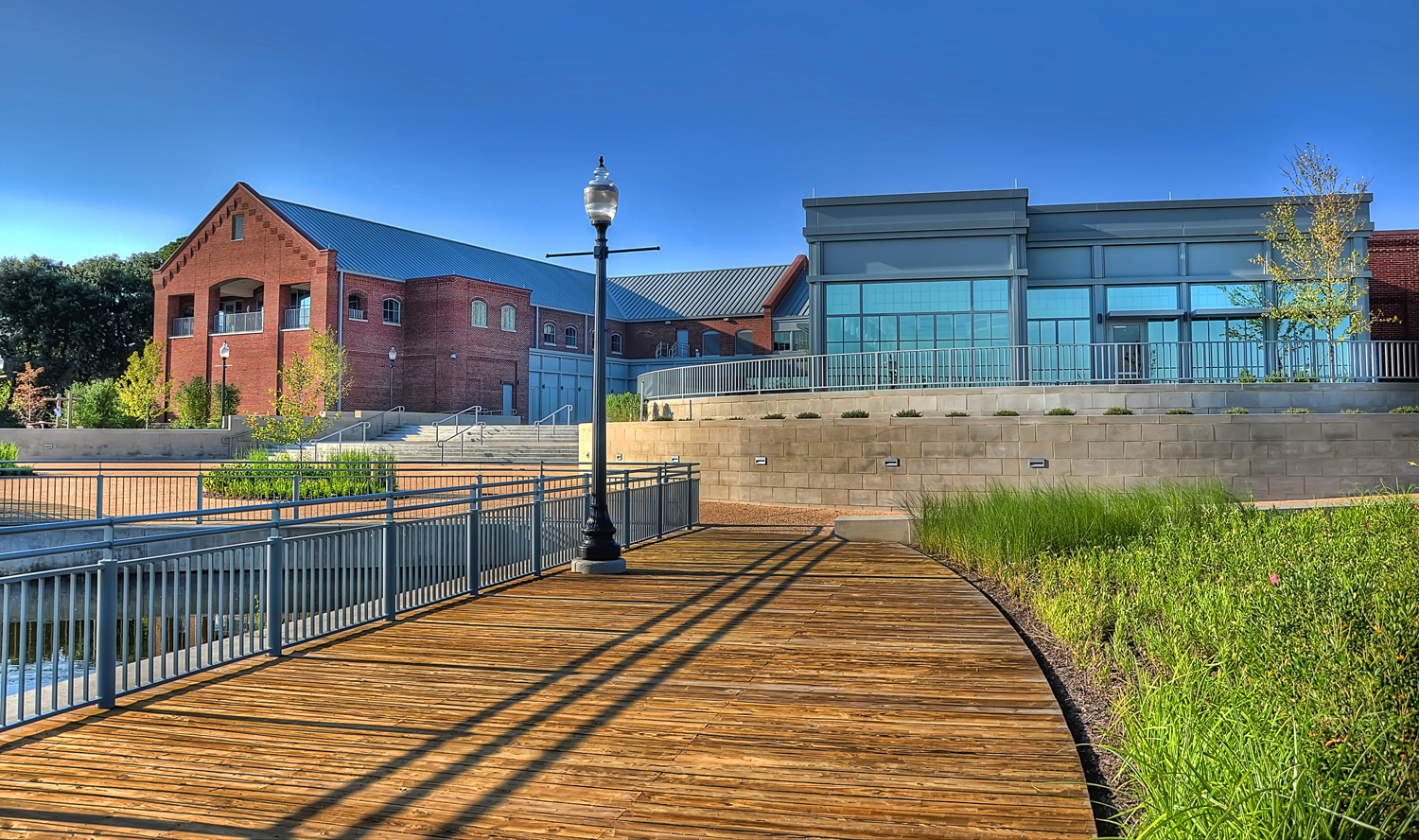
North Carolina History Center

In October 2010, Tryon Palace opened the North Carolina History Center, a 60,000-square-foot (5,600 m^{2}) facility on six acres. It features interactive technology and living history programs. The new building contains two major museums – the Pepsi Family Center and the Regional History Museum, a museum store, two orientation rooms and a larger programming space usable as classrooms, a 200-seat state-of-the-art performing arts hall, a waterfront café, and program and administrative space.

Visitors enter the Pepsi Family Center via a virtual time machine that takes them to the year 1835 in Craven County. Here, historic roles can be adopted that allow for a number of hands-on activities. The Center provides an intergenerational, interactive learning adventure for parents and children working as teams: sailing a ship, distilling turpentine and producing naval stores, piecing an electronic quilt, and helping the shopkeeper find merchandise for customers in the dry goods store.

The Regional History Museum has been transformed from a conventional artifact-based museum to one that incorporates layered contextual graphics, multimedia and visitor interactivity. It takes the visitor on an exploration of the interrelationships of the central coastal area of North Carolina with the world, teaching how local events influenced, or were influenced by, state, national and international events.

The North Carolina History Center is housed in a 60,000-square-foot (5,600 m^{2}) building on a six-acre site on the Trent River adjacent to the Governor's Palace (west side) and downtown New Bern (east side). The site is a former industrial or Brownfield land site. It was classified as a Superfund property and a major contaminant of the Neuse River basin. Administration of remediation was handled under the North Carolina Superfund, part of the North Carolina Department of Environment and Natural Resources (DENR).

This is a green-designed project including the construction of wetlands that filter storm-water run-off from a 50-acre area of the New Bern Historic District. The run-off is captured in a large underground cistern that recycles the water for irrigation and replenishment of the wetlands. The parking area also has a permeable surface allowing for absorption of run-off. The building is constructed of recycled materials. A commissioning agent has insured the operational efficiency of all mechanical and electrical equipment. And, the North Carolina History Center is planned for LEED certification at the silver level (Leadership in Environmental and Energy Design).

The landscape features outdoor exhibits to encourage visitors to explore the natural history of the central coast as well as the story of naturalist and explorer John Lawson, who lived in eastern North Carolina in 1710. Knowledge of the settlers’ 18th-century land use educates visitors about environmental best practices in the 21st century.

== In popular culture ==
- Three episodes of the FOX TV series Sleepy Hollow were filmed on the palace grounds.
- Tryon Palace staff and buildings provided the backdrop for early 1800s life depicted in the Mystery Mardi Gras Shipwreck documentary.
- The Outlander television series has scenes that take place in Tryon Palace.
