= Jürgen Oesten =

German Naval Officer

- Born: 24 October 1913; Grunewald, Berlin, German Empire
- Died: 5 August 2010 (aged 96); Hamburg, Germany
- Military career
- Allegiance: Nazi Germany
- Branch: Kriegsmarine
- Service years: 1933–45
- Rank: Korvettenkapitän
- Units: SSS Gorch Fock; Karlsruhe; Admiral Graf Spee; U-20
- Commands: U-61; U-106; U-861
- Conflicts: Spanish Civil War; World War II; Battle of the Atlantic; Yanagi missions
- Awards: Knight's Cross of the Iron Cross

Jürgen Oesten (24 October 1913 – 5 August 2010) was a German naval officer who served as a U-boat commander in the Kriegsmarine during World War II. He commanded the U-boats U-61 and U-106, and then served as a staff officer before returning to command U-861. He held the rank of Korvettenkapitän. Oesten sank nineteen ships for a total of 101,744 gross register tons (GRT), and damaged four others for 51,668 GRT.

== Career ==
Born in Grunewald, Berlin, Oesten joined the Reichsmarine in April 1933. After serving aboard the cruisers Admiral Graf Spee and Karlsruhe he transferred to the U-boat arm in May 1937, and was appointed watch officer of U-20.

=== World War II ===
==== U-61 ====
In August 1939 Oesten commissioned U-61, sailing on nine patrols, and sinking five ships.

==== U-106 ====
Taking command of U-106 in September 1940, he sailed on three patrols sinking another ten ships. On 20 March 1941 during an attack on convoy SL-68 he damaged the British battleship HMS Malaya.

==== 9th Flotilla ====
In October 1941 Oesten became the first commander of the 9th U-boat Flotilla based in Brest, France. In March 1942 he joined the staff of FdU Nordmeer directing the U-boat war in the Norwegian Sea.

==== U-861 ====
In September 1943 Oesten returned to active duty in U-861, sailing first to Brazilian waters where he sank another two ships and then around the Cape of Good Hope to join the Monsun Gruppe of U-boats operating in the Indian Ocean. He sank another two ships, bringing his career total to 19 ships sunk, totalling 101,744 GRT, and four ships damaged (51,668 GRT), before reaching Penang on 23 September 1944. U-861 left Soerabaya, Dutch East Indies, in January 1945 carrying a cargo of vital materials, but only two torpedoes, and reached Trondheim, Norway, in April, just before the German surrender.

=== Post War ===
Oesten was a technical advisor for the 2005 submarine simulator Silent Hunter III.

=== Awards ===
- U-Boat War Badge
- Wehrmacht Long Service Award, 4th class
- Spanish Cross in bronze without swords (6 June 1939)
- Iron Cross (1939)
  - 2nd Class (3 December 1939)
  - 1st Class (27 February 1940)
- Sudetenland Medal (20 December 1939)
- Knight's Cross of the Iron Cross on 26 March 1941 as Kapitänleutnant and commander of U-106
