= Coor-Bishop House =

Historic house in North Carolina, United States

- U.S. National Register of Historic Places
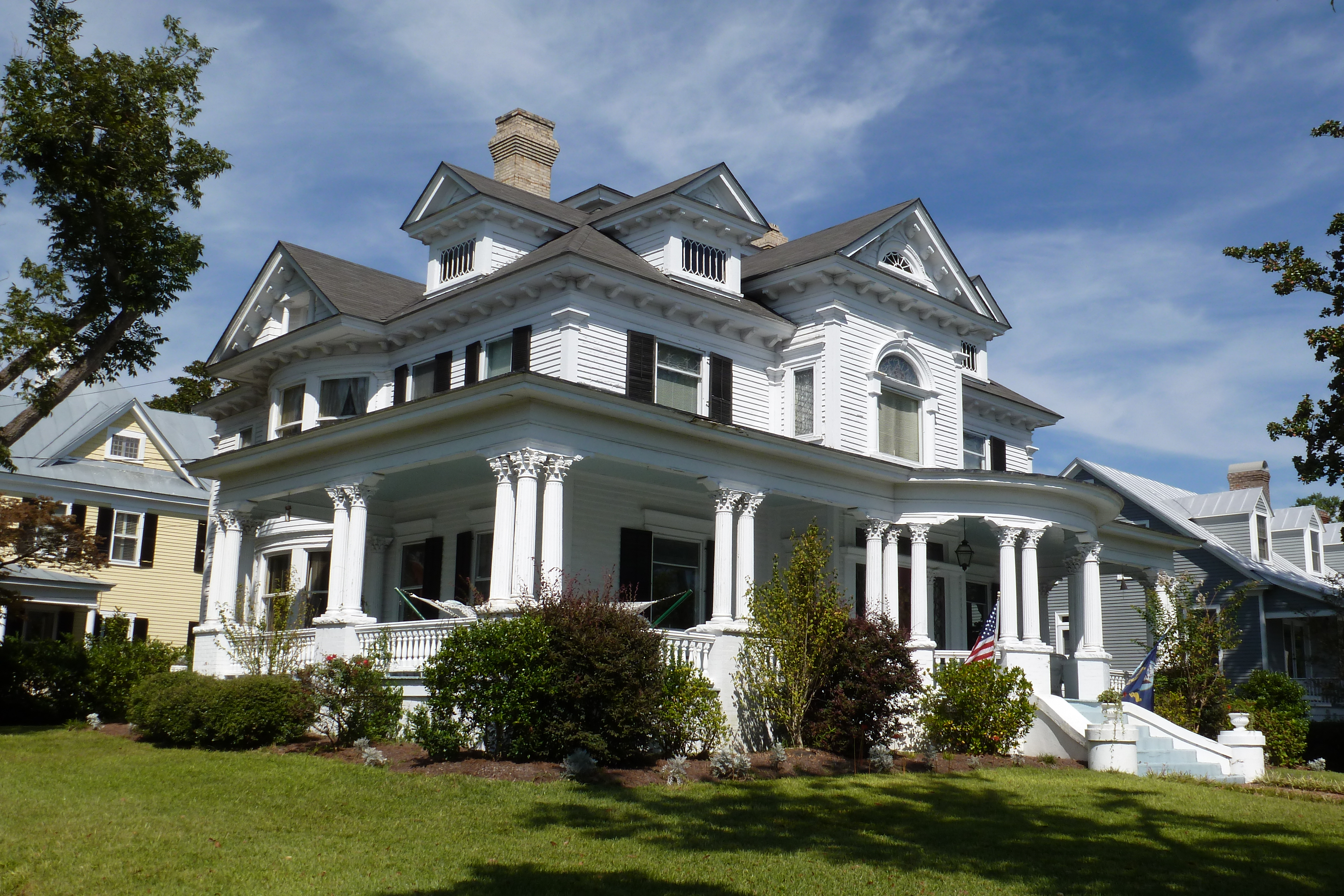
- Coor-Bishop House, September 2012

- Location within North Carolina Location within the United States
- Location: 501 E. Front St., New Bern, North Carolina
- Coordinates: 35°6′33″N 77°2′10″W
- Area: less than one acre
- Built: 1767, 1904-1908
- Built by: James Coor (orig)
- Architect: John Hawks (orig); Herbert W. Simpson (1904 remodel)
- Architectural style: Classical Revival, Georgian
- NRHP reference No.: 72000939
- Added to NRHP: November 9, 1972

Coor-Bishop House is a historic home located at New Bern, Craven County, North Carolina. The original home was designed in the Georgian style by John Hawks and built about 1767. Between 1904 and 1908, the house was extensively remodeled to incorporate both Queen Anne and Georgian Revival concepts. The two-story frame dwelling features a high deck-on-hip roof, a projecting entrance pavilion, and a wide wraparound porch with Corinthian order columns.

It was listed on the National Register of Historic Places in 1972.
