= Elmwood (Raleigh, North Carolina) =

Historic house in North Carolina, United States

- U.S. National Register of Historic Places
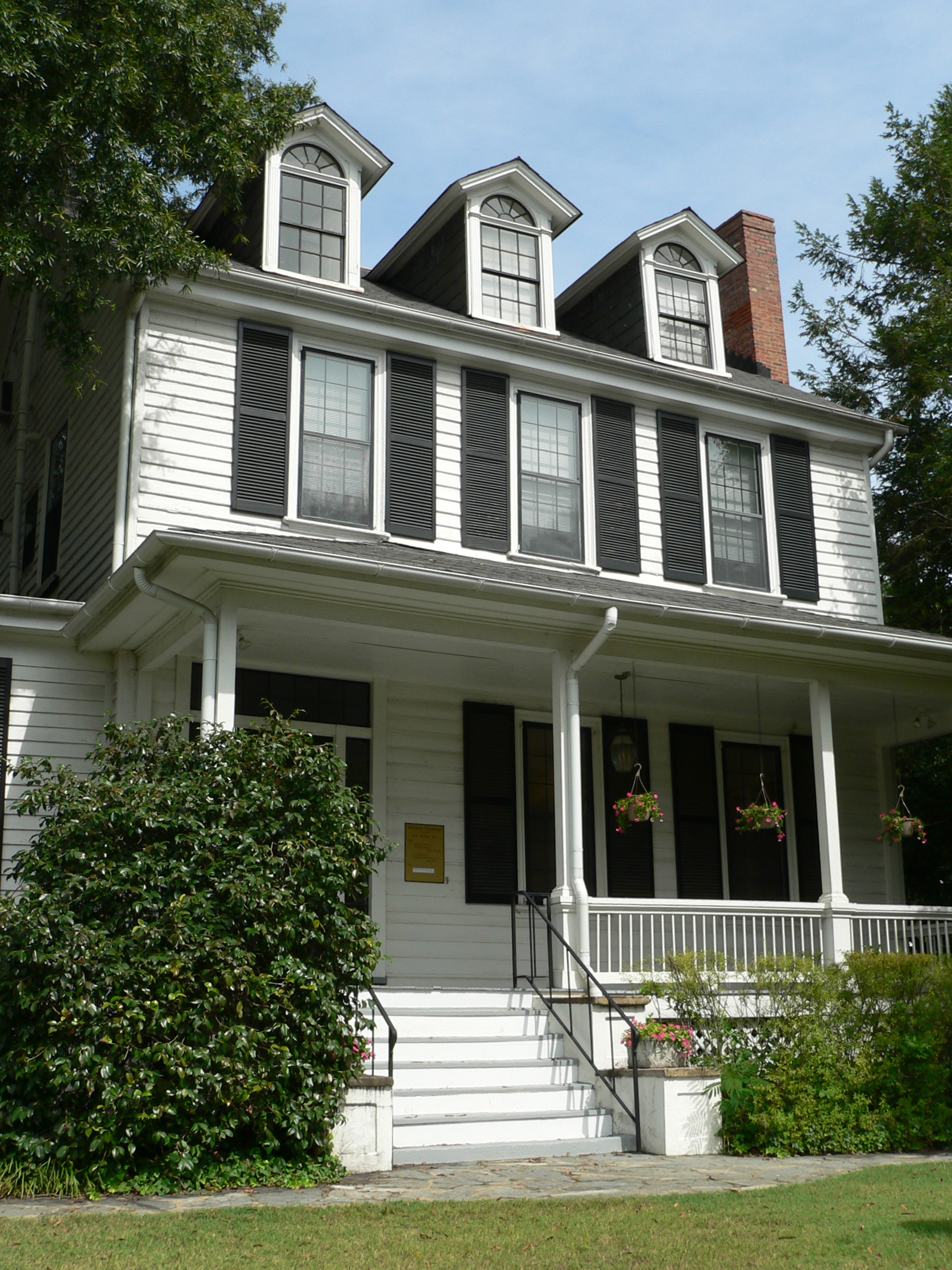
- Elmwood, September 2014

- Location within North Carolina Location within the United States
- Location: 16 N. Boylan Ave., Raleigh, North Carolina
- Coordinates: 35°46′53″N 78°38′56″W
- Area: less than one acre
- Built: 1810-1815, c. 1830, c. 1870, c. 1890-1910
- Architectural style: Federal
- NRHP reference No.: 75001294
- Added to NRHP: October 29, 1975

Elmwood is a historic home located at Raleigh, Wake County, North Carolina. It was built about 1810–1815, and is a 2 1/2-story, three bay by four bay, Federal-style frame dwelling with a gable roof and dormers. It is sheathed in weatherboard and has two exterior end double-shouldered chimneys. It has a two-story wing added about 1830, and asymmetrical side and rear additions built about 1870, and between about 1890 and 1910. It features a one-story full-width front porch with a hipped roof added about 1870. It was the home of John Louis Taylor (1769–1829), an American jurist and first Chief Justice of the North Carolina Supreme Court, and North Carolina politicians William Gaston (1778-1844) and Romulus Mitchell Saunders (1791-1867).

It was listed on the National Register of Historic Places in 1975.
