= North Carolina State Toast =

American drinking ritual

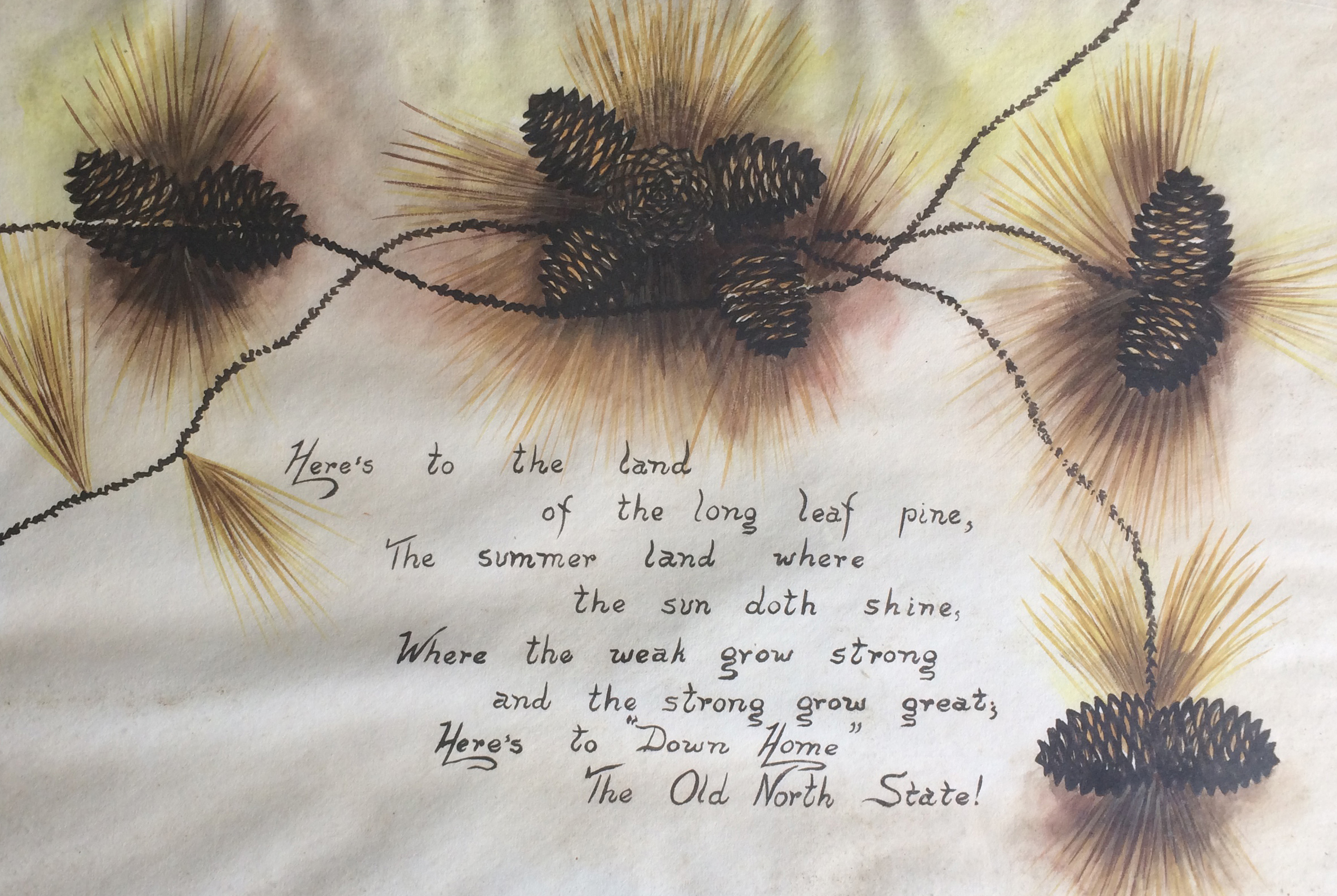
North Carolina State Toast

The Official Toast to the State of North Carolina is a 1904 poem in honor of the state which was officially adopted by the General Assembly as the state toast in 1957.

== History ==
The poem is believed to have first been published to the public on May 20th, 1904 in Richmond, VA at a dinner in commemoration of anniversary of the Mecklenburg Declaration of Independence held by the North Carolina Society of Richmond. It is believed to have been written by Leonora Monteiro Martin specifically for the event, and was read as a toast at the conclusion of the meeting.It was printed the next morning in Richmond Papers, and quickly became a patriotic staple of North Carolinian gatherings and publications.

In the 1930s a tune for the poem was written by music teacher Mary Burke Kerr, who had memorized the text as a child. The tune was officially recognized by the General Assembly in 1933, and generations of children learned the song in North Carolina schools.

The words and tune were adopted as the Official State Toast in 1957. North Carolina is the only state with an official state toast.

== Text ==
Here's to the land of the long leaf pine,
The summer land where the sun doth shine,
Where the weak grow strong and the strong grow great,
Here's to "Down Home," the Old North State!

Here's to the land of the cotton bloom white,
Where the scuppernong perfumes the breeze at night,
Where the soft southern moss and jessamine mate,
'Neath the murmuring pines of the Old North State!

Here's to the land where the galax grows,
Where the rhododendron's roseate glows,
Where soars Mount Mitchell's summit great,
In the "Land of the Sky," in the Old North State!

Here's to the land where maidens are fair,
Where friends are true and cold hearts rare,
The near land, the dear land, whatever fate,
The blessed land, the best land, the Old North State!

== Common uses ==
The State Toast is used at some functions within the University of North Carolina. The University of North Carolina at Chapel Hill's oldest student organization, the Dialectic and Philanthropic Societies, deliver the toast twice annually, once at their annual 'December' formal and one at their 'April' semiformal.

People inducted into the Order of the Long Leaf Pine become "cultural ambassadors of the state" and "can propose the state toast at any time."

== See also ==
- "The Old North State", North Carolina's state song.
