= German submarine U-861 =

German World War II submarine

History

Nazi Germany
- Name: U-861
- Ordered: 5 June 1941
- Builder: DeSchiMAG AG Weser, Bremen
- Yard number: 1067
- Laid down: 15 July 1942
- Launched: 29 April 1943
- Commissioned: 2 September 1943
- Fate: Surrendered on 9 May 1945; Sunk on 31 December 1945 during Operation Deadlight

General characteristics
- Class & type: Type IXD2 submarine
- Displacement: 1,610 t (1,580 long tons) surfaced; 1,799 t (1,771 long tons) submerged
- Length: 87.58 m (287 ft 4 in) o/a; 68.50 m (224 ft 9 in) pressure hull
- Beam: 7.50 m (24 ft 7 in) o/a; 4.40 m (14 ft 5 in) pressure hull
- Height: 10.20 m (33 ft 6 in)
- Draught: 5.40 m (17 ft 9 in)
- Installed power: 9,000 PS (6,620 kW; 8,880 bhp) (diesels); 1,000 PS (740 kW; 990 shp) (electric)
- Propulsion: 2 shafts; 2 × diesel engines; 2 × electric motors
- Speed: 20.8 knots (38.5 km/h; 23.9 mph) surfaced; 6.9 knots (12.8 km/h; 7.9 mph) submerged
- Range: 12,750 nmi (23,610 km; 14,670 mi) at 10 knots (19 km/h; 12 mph) surfaced; 57 nmi (106 km; 66 mi) at 4 knots (7.4 km/h; 4.6 mph) submerged
- Test depth: 230 m (750 ft)
- Complement: 55 to 64
- Armament: 6 × torpedo tubes (four bow, two stern); 24 × 53.3 cm (21 in) torpedoes; 1 × 10.5 cm (4.1 in) SK C/32 deck gun (150 rounds); 1 × 3.7 cm (1.5 in) Flak M42 AA gun; 2 × 2 cm (0.79 in) C/30 anti-aircraft guns

Service record
- Part of: 4th U-boat Flotilla; 2 September 1943 – 31 March 1944; 12th U-boat Flotilla; 1 April – 30 September 1944; 33rd U-boat Flotilla; 1 October 1944 – 6 May 1945
- Identification codes: M 54 873
- Commanders: Kptlt. / K.Kapt. Jürgen Oesten; 2 September 1943 – 9 May 1945
- Operations: 2 patrols: 1st patrol: a. 20 April – 23 September 1944; b. 1 – 2 November 1944; c. 3 – 5 November 1944; 2nd patrol: 15 January – 19 April 1945
- Victories: 3 merchant ships sunk (20,311 GRT); 1 auxiliary warship sunk (1,737 GRT); 1 merchant ship damaged (8,139 GRT)

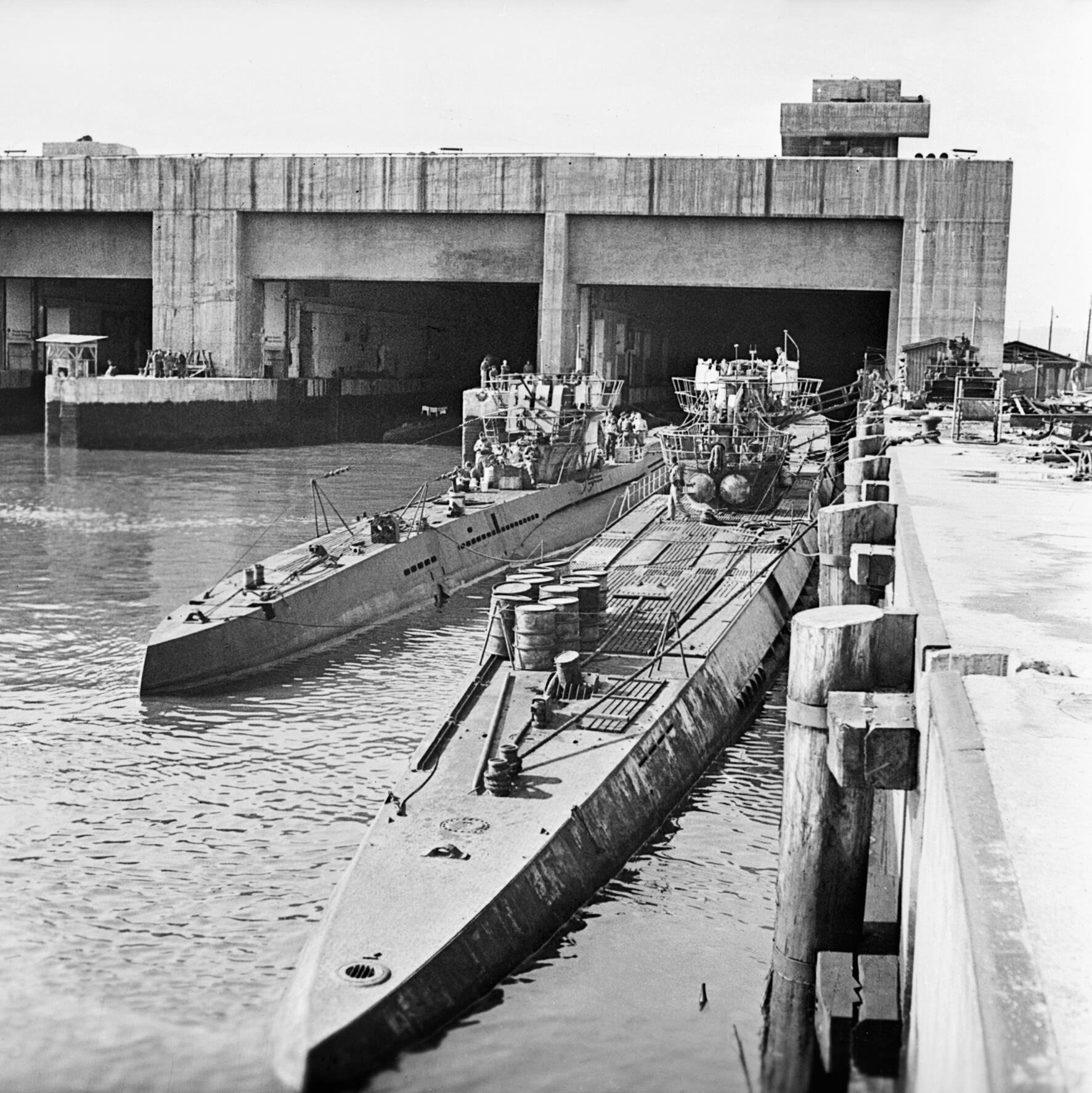
U-boats after the war

German submarine U-861 was a long-range Type IXD2 U-boat built for Nazi Germany's Kriegsmarine during World War II. Laid down in Bremen and launched on 29 April 1943. She was equipped with two stern torpedo tubes and 24 mines.

She was commanded throughout her service life by Korvettenkapitän Jürgen Oesten (Knight's Cross).

This ship is best known for sinking Vital de Oliveira, the only Brazilian military vessel lost during combat in World War II. (Note: The Brazilian Navy lost other ships during the Second World War without this being the result of the action of a belligerent: for example, the Camaqua sank on July 21, 1944 due to bad weather)

== Design ==
German Type IXD2 submarines were considerably larger than the original Type IXs. U-861 had a displacement of 1,610 tonnes (1,580 long tons) when at the surface and 1,799 tonnes (1,771 long tons) while submerged. The U-boat had a total length of 87.58 m (287 ft 4 in), a pressure hull length of 68.50 m (224 ft 9 in), a beam of 7.50 m (24 ft 7 in), a height of 10.20 m (33 ft 6 in), and a draught of 5.35 m (17 ft 7 in). The submarine was powered by two MAN M 9 V 40/46 supercharged four-stroke, nine-cylinder diesel engines plus two MWM RS34.5S six-cylinder four-stroke diesel engines for cruising, producing a total of 9,000 metric horsepower (6,620 kW; 8,880 shp) for use while surfaced, two Siemens-Schuckert 2 GU 345/34 double-acting electric motors producing a total of 1,000 shaft horsepower (1,010 PS; 750 kW) for use while submerged. She had two shafts and two 1.85 m (6 ft) propellers. The boat was capable of operating at depths of up to 200 metres (660 ft).

The submarine had a maximum surface speed of 20.8 knots (38.5 km/h; 23.9 mph) and a maximum submerged speed of 6.9 knots (12.8 km/h; 7.9 mph). When submerged, the boat could operate for 121 nautical miles (224 km; 139 mi) at 2 knots (3.7 km/h; 2.3 mph); when surfaced, she could travel 12,750 nautical miles (23,610 km; 14,670 mi) at 10 knots (19 km/h; 12 mph). U-861 was fitted with six 53.3 cm (21 in) torpedo tubes (four fitted at the bow and two at the stern), 24 torpedoes, one 10.5 cm (4.13 in) SK C/32 naval gun, 150 rounds, and a 3.7 cm (1.5 in) Flak M42 with 2575 rounds as well as two 2 cm (0.79 in) C/30 anti-aircraft guns with 8100 rounds. The boat had a complement of fifty-five.

== Service history ==
She joined 4th Flotilla for training on 2 September 1943, where she remained until 31 March 1944. She then joined 12th Flotilla for active service until 30 September 1944. For her last assignment, she joined 33rd Flotilla, as part of Monsoon Group operating out of Penang in the Indian Ocean, on 1 October 1944 until the end of the war. On her final long trip back to Norway carrying vital supplies from the Far East, she struck an iceberg south of Greenland, but reached Trondheim safely on 19 April 1945, with very little fuel remaining.

=== Fate ===
U-861 surrendered on 9 May 1945 at Trondheim, Norway. She was transferred to Lisahally, Northern Ireland, shortly afterwards.

She was sunk by the Royal Navy on 31 December 1945 in position 55°25′N 07°15′W as part of Operation Deadlight.

== Summary of raiding history ==
Date	Ship Name	Nationality	Tonnage (GRT)	Fate
20 July 1944	Vital de Oliveira	Brazil	1,737	Sunk
24 July 1944	William Gaston	United States	7,177	Sunk
20 August 1944	Berwickshire	United Kingdom	7,464	Sunk
20 August 1944	Daronia	United Kingdom	8,139	Damaged
5 September 1944	Ioannis Fafalios	Greece	5,670	Sunk

== Bibliography ==
- Busch, Rainer; Röll, Hans-Joachim (1999). German U-boat commanders of World War II : a biographical dictionary. Translated by Brooks, Geoffrey. London, Annapolis, Md: Greenhill Books, Naval Institute Press. ISBN 1-55750-186-6.
- Busch, Rainer; Röll, Hans-Joachim (1999). Der U-Boot-Krieg, 1939-1945: Deutsche U-Boot-Verluste von September 1939 bis Mai 1945 [German U-boat losses from September 1939 to May 1945] (in German). Vol. IV. Hamburg, Berlin, Bonn: Mittler. ISBN 3-8132-0514-2.
- Gröner, Eric; Jung, Dieter; Maass, Martin (1991). German Warships 1815-1945: U-boats and Mine Warfare Vessels. Vol. 2. Translated by Thomas, Keith; Magowan, Rachel. London: Conway Maritime Press. ISBN 0-85177-593-4.
