= Claude J. Sauthier =

Claude Joseph Sauthier (1736–1802) was an illustrator, draftsman, surveyor, and mapmaker. He was employed by the British colonial government in the American colonies prior to and during the American Revolutionary War.

== Early life ==
Sauthier was born November 10, 1736, in Strasbourg, France. His early training was as an illustrator and draftsman, and his influences were the master garden designers Dezallier d'Argenville and Jean-Baptiste Alexandre Le Blond. Several of Sauthier’s works from the 1750s are archived in the library of the Grand Seminaire de Strasbourg. In 1763, Sauthier wrote A Treatis on Public Architecture and Garden Planning.

== Arrival in North Carolina ==
Sauthier migrated to America in 1767 at the request of British royal Governor of North Carolina William Tryon. Sauthier accompanied Governor Tryon throughout the Province of North Carolina from 1768 to 1771, mapping towns that were deemed militarily important to Tryon. Sauthier surveyed and created maps of Bath, Beaufort, Brunswick Town, Cross Creek (now Fayetteville), Edenton, Halifax, Hillsborough, New Bern, Salisbury, Wilmington, and the Camp and Battlefield of Alamance. He was also involved in the design of the gardens of the governor’s house (now known as Tryon Palace) in New Bern. Original copies of Sauthier’s maps are archived in the King George III's Topographical Collection at the British Library in London, the Public Record Office in London, the North Carolina Division of Archives and History in Raleigh, North Carolina, and the Clinton Collection at the William L. Clements Library at the University of Michigan.

== Later life ==
When Tryon left North Carolina in mid-1771 to assume the position of British royal governor of New York, Sauthier accompanied him there, and was appointed surveyor for the Province of New York by Tryon. During this period, Sauthier was also instrumental in surveying the boundary between New York and Quebec.

In 1776, Sauthier surveyed and mapped Staten Island, New York, for British General William Howe, and surveyed and mapped Fort Washington on Manhattan Island after troops under the command of General Hugh Percy attacked and captured it. General Percy retained Sauthier on his staff when he commanded the British forces holding Rhode Island.

In May 1777, when General Percy returned to his familial home at Alnwick Castle in England, Sauthier accompanied him, and was employed as Percy’s secretary.

== Death ==
In 1790, Sauthier returned to his native Strasbourg. He died November 26, 1802, at the age of 66.

== Gallery of maps ==
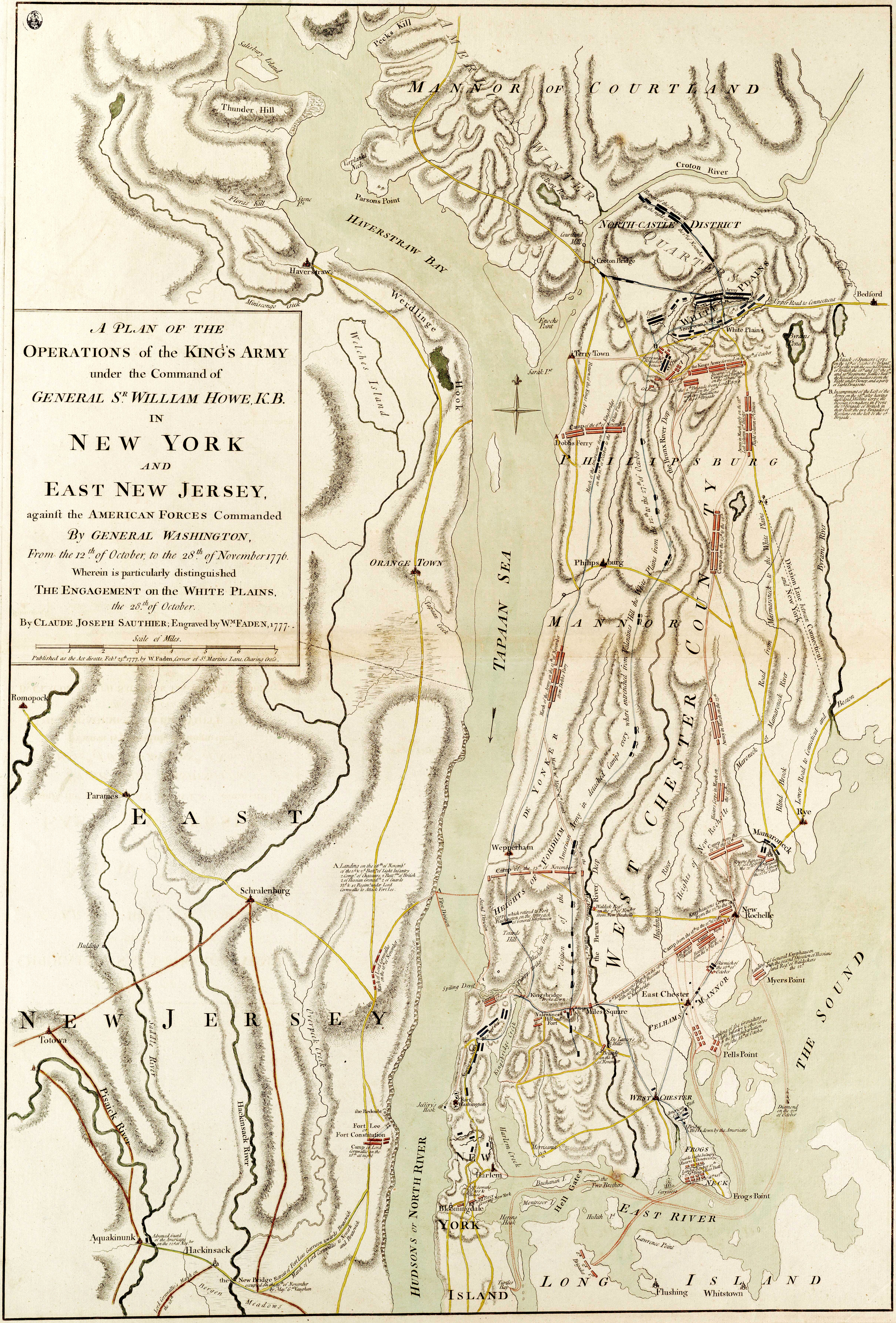
Military map showing troop movements before, during, and after the Battle of White Plains on October 28, 1776

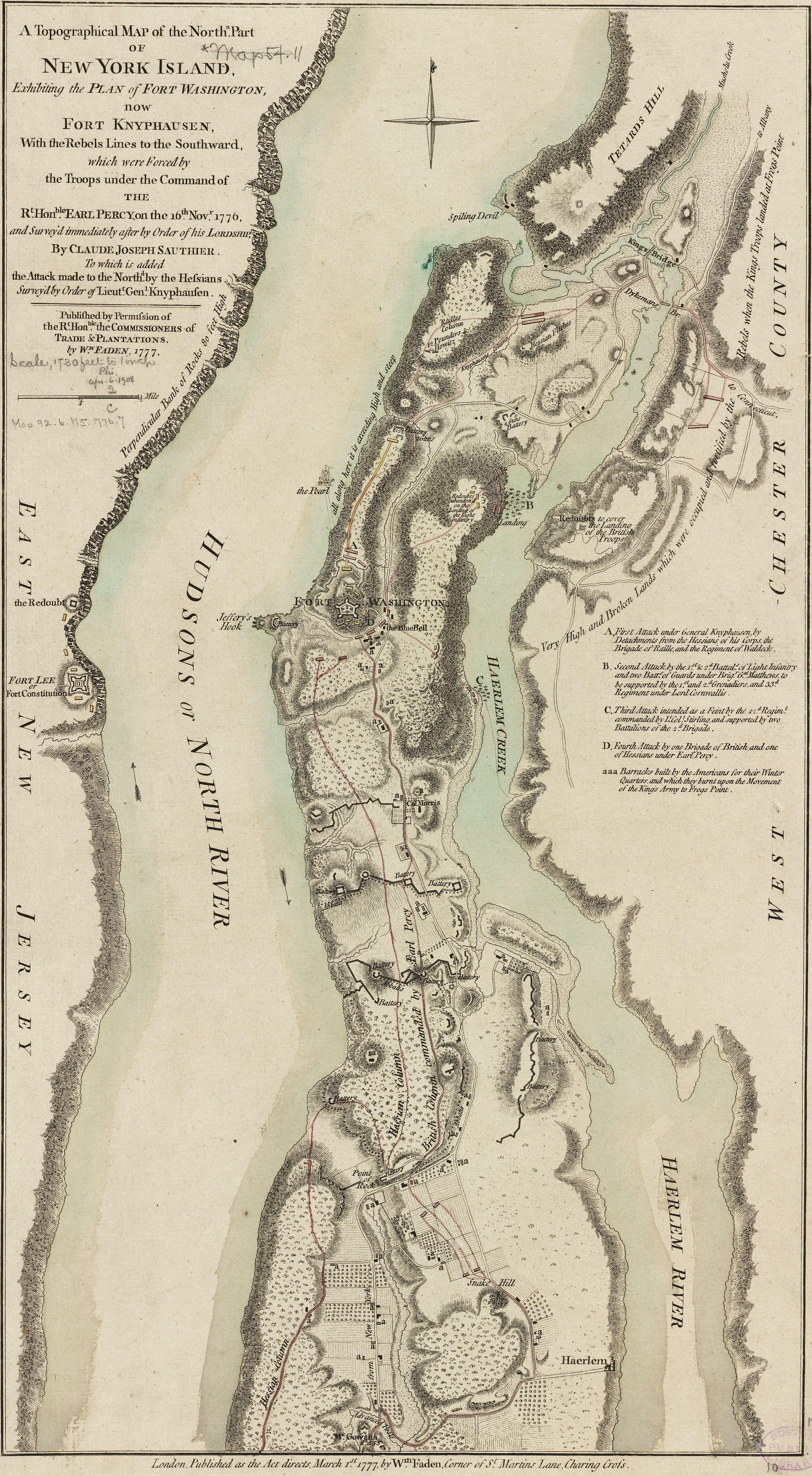
Military map detailing the Battle of Fort Washington on November 16, 1776

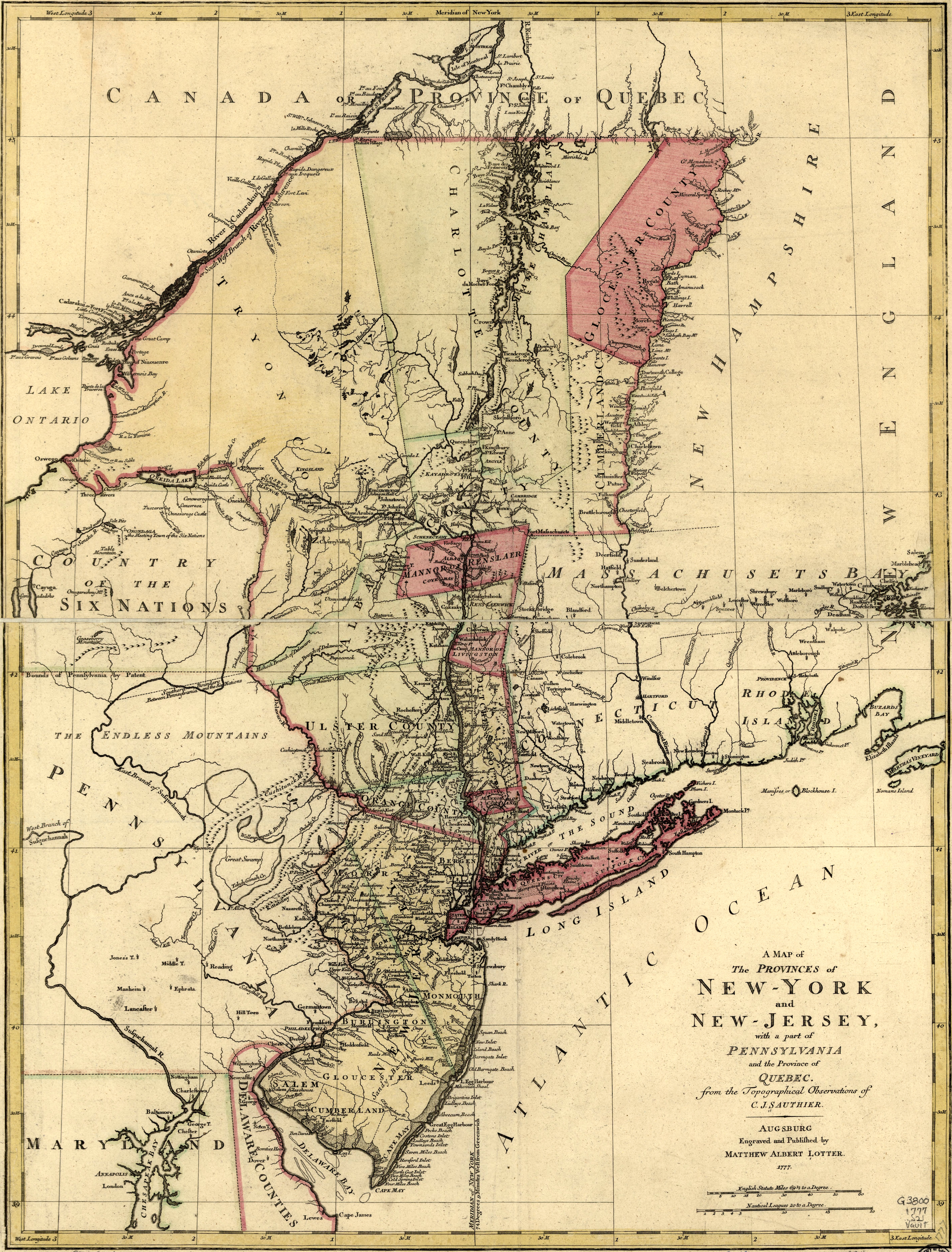
Map of the Provinces of New York and New Jersey, with a part of Pennsylvania and the Province of Quebec, 1777
