= Coor-Gaston House =

Historic house in North Carolina, United States

- U.S. National Register of Historic Places
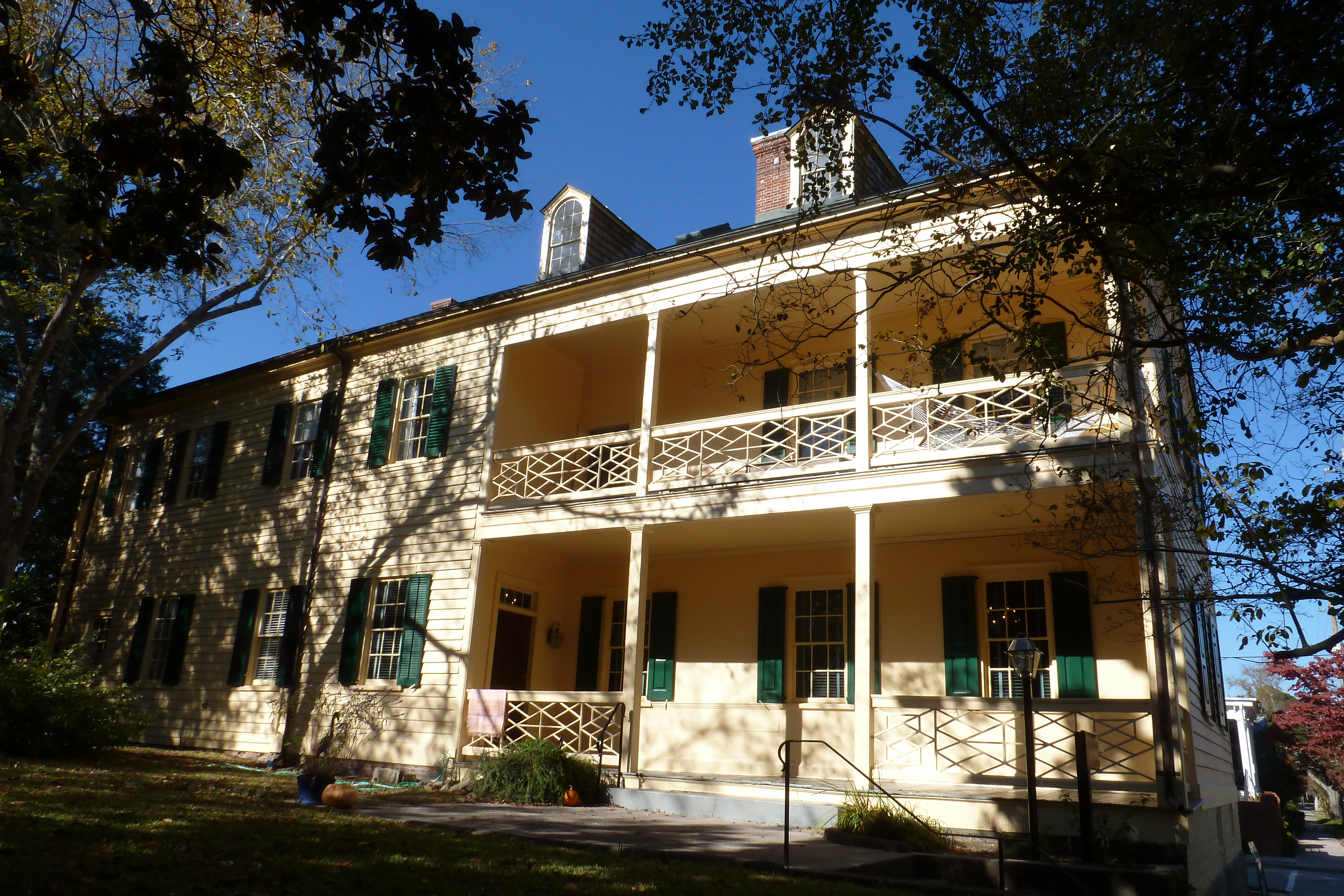
- Coor-Gaston House, November 2012

- Location within North Carolina Location within the United States
- Location: 421 Craven St., New Bern, North Carolina
- Coordinates: 35°6′32″N 77°2′18″W
- Area: 0.3 acres (0.12 ha)
- Built: c. 1767
- Architect: Coor, James
- Architectural style: Georgian
- NRHP reference No.: 72000940
- Added to NRHP: February 1, 1972

Coor-Gaston House, also known as the Judge William Gaston House, is a historic home located at New Bern, Craven County, North Carolina. It was built in 1774, as determined by dendrochronology, and is a 2 1/2-story, "L"-plan, Georgian style frame dwelling with a gable roof. It features a two-tier porch enclosed by Chinese trellis railings and supported by Doric order pillars. It was the home of Congressman and jurist William Gaston (1778–1844).

It was listed on the National Register of Historic Places in 1972.

James Coor (1737–1795) built the house soon after 1767. After his death it was owned by his heirs until bought by William Gaston in 1818.
