= John Wright Stanly House =

Historic house in North Carolina, United States

- U.S. National Register of Historic Places
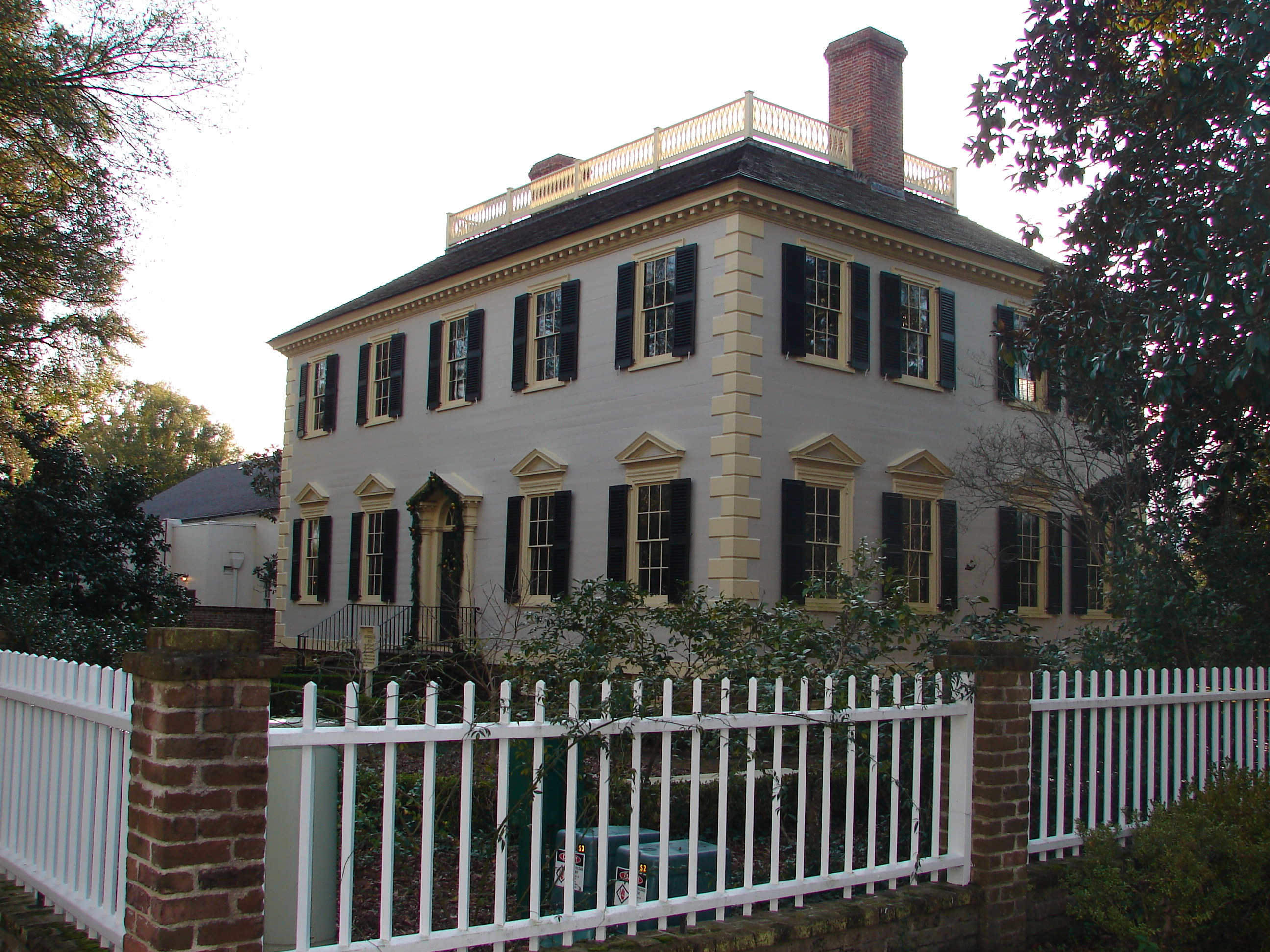
- John Wright Stanly House

- Location within North Carolina Location within the United States
- Location: 307 George St., New Bern, North Carolina
- Coordinates: 35°6′26″N 77°2′41″W
- Built: c. 1779
- Architect: Hawks, John
- Architectural style: Georgian
- NRHP reference No.: 70000450
- Added to NRHP: February 26, 1970

The John Wright Stanly House is a historic home located at New Bern, Craven County, North Carolina. It was probably designed by John Hawks and built about 1779. It is a two-story, five-bay, central hall plan Georgian style frame dwelling. It has a hipped roof and roof deck with balustrade. The building housed a public library from 1935 to 1965. It has been moved twice, coming to its present location in 1965, and subsequently restored as part of the Tryon Palace complex.

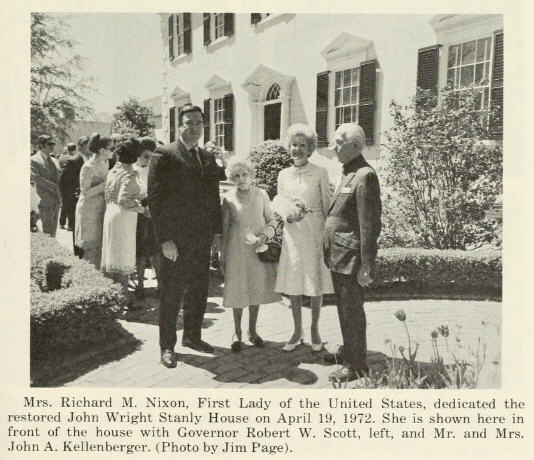
"Mrs. Richard M. Nixon, First Lady of the United States, dedicated the restored John Wright Stanly House on April 19, 1972. She is shown here in front of the house with Governor Robert W. Scott, left, and Mr. and Mrs. John A. Kellenberger."

The house's namesake is former owner John Wright Stanly, a Revolutionary War veteran. It was listed on the National Register of Historic Places in 1970.
