= The Old North State (song) =

State song of North Carolina, USA

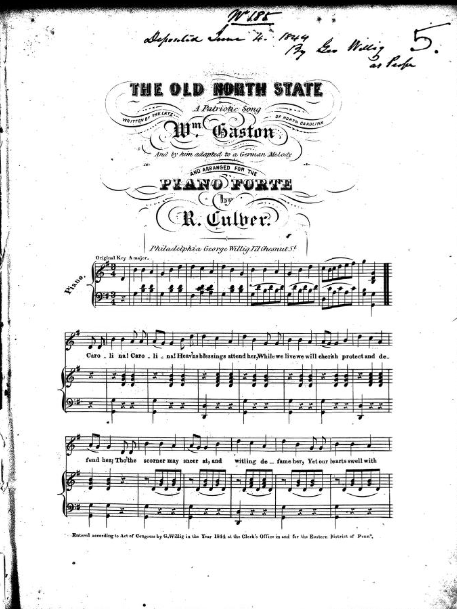
- Regional anthem of North Carolina
- Lyrics: William Gaston, 1835
- Music: E.E. Randolph, 1926
- Published: 1851; 175 years ago
- Adopted: February 18, 1927; 99 years ago

Audio sample
- "The Old North State" (instrumental): file; help

"The Old North State" is the official state song and regional anthem of the U.S. state of North Carolina. Written by William Gaston in 1835 and set to an arrangement composed by Mrs. E.E. Randolph in 1926, it was adopted as the state song by the North Carolina General Assembly in 1927.

== Lyrics ==
Carolina! Carolina! Heaven's blessings attend her!
While we live, we will cherish, protect and defend her;
Tho' the scorner may sneer at, and witlings defame her,
Still our hearts swell with gladness whenever we name her.

Hurrah! Hurrah! The Old North State Forever
Hurrah! Hurrah! The good Old North State!

Tho' she envies not others, their merited glory,
Say whose name stands the foremost, in Liberty's story,
Tho' too true to herself e'er to crouch to oppression,
Who can yield to just rule a more loyal submission?

Hurrah! Hurrah! The Old North State forever!
Hurrah! Hurrah! The good Old North State!

Then let all those who love us, love the land that we live in,
As happy a region as on this side of heaven,
Where plenty and peace, love and joy smile before us,
Raise aloud, raise together the heart thrilling chorus.

Hurrah! Hurrah! The Old North State forever!
Hurrah! Hurrah! The good Old North State!

== See also ==
- North Carolina State Toast
