= William Gaston =

American judge

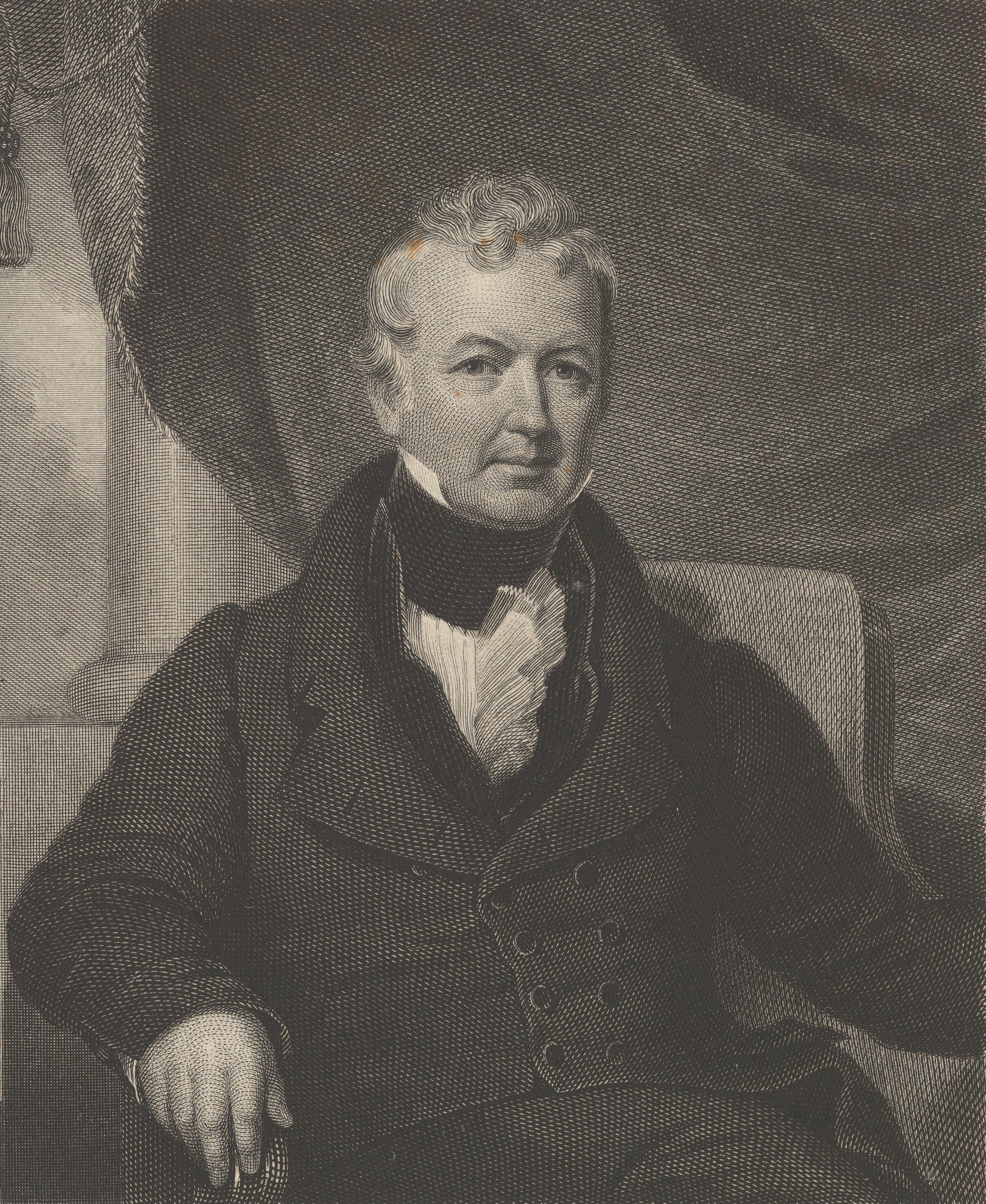
- Portrait of Gaston by Asher Brown Durand, 1834

Member of the U.S. House of Representatives from North Carolina's 4th district
- In office March 4, 1813 – March 3, 1817
- Preceded by: William Blackledge
- Succeeded by: Jesse Slocumb

Personal details
- Born: September 19, 1778 New Bern, North Carolina, US
- Died: January 23, 1844 (aged 65) Raleigh, North Carolina, US
- Party: Federalist, Whig
- Spouses: Susan Hay (m. 1803; died 1804) Hannah McClure (m. 1805; died 1813) Eliza Ann Worthington (m. 1816; died 1819)
- Children: 5
- Education: Georgetown University
- Alma mater: Princeton University

William J. Gaston (September 19, 1778 – January 23, 1844) was a jurist and United States Representative from North Carolina. He was the author of the official state song of North Carolina, "The Old North State". Gaston County, North Carolina, created just after his death, was named for him, as later were the city of Gastonia, North Carolina, artificial Lake Gaston, and the Gaston Hall auditorium at his alma mater, Georgetown University.

== Early life ==
Gaston was born in New Bern, North Carolina, on September 19, 1778. He was the son of Dr. Alexander Gaston and Margaret Sharpe.

He entered Georgetown Academy, a Roman Catholic school in Washington, D.C. in 1791 at the age of thirteen, becoming its first student. Due to illness shortly thereafter, he also became its first dropout. After Georgetown and some education in North Carolina, he studied law at the College of New Jersey (today Princeton University), graduating in 1796.

== Career ==
Gaston was admitted to the bar in 1798 and commenced practice in New Bern. He was a member of the North Carolina General Assembly in 1800, served in the State House of Commons (now known as the House of Representatives) from 1807 to 1809, and as its Speaker in 1808. He was a member of the North Carolina State Senate in 1812. He was elected to the U.S. House of Representatives, on the Federalist ticket, serving from March 4, 1813, to March 3, 1817 (the 13th and 14th U.S. Congresses). While in Congress, he obtained a federal charter for Georgetown College (today Georgetown University). In 1814, Gaston was elected a member of the American Antiquarian Society. In 1817, he was elected a member of the American Philosophical Society.

Gaston did not run for Congress in 1816, returning to serve in the North Carolina Senate in 1818–1819. He again served in the U.S. House of Representatives in 1824, 1827, 1828, 1829, and 1831.

In 1832, Gaston delivered the annual graduation address at the University of North Carolina. Although he owned slaves, his speech included what was the last public statement in North Carolina urging the abolition of slavery:

As your country grows in years, you must also cause it to grow in science, literature, arts and refinement. It will be for you to develope and multiply its resources, to check the faults of manners as they rise, and to advance the cause of industry, temperance, moderation, justice, morals and religion, all around you. On you too, will devolve the duty which has been too long neglected, but which cannot with impunity be neglected much longer, of providing for the mitigation, and (is it too much to hope for in North-Carolina?) for the ultimate extirpation of the worst evil that afflicts the Southern part of our Confederacy. Full well do you know to what I refer, for on this subject there is, with all of us, a morbid sensitiveness which gives warning even of an approach to it. Disguise the truth as we may, and throw the blame where we will, it is Slavery which, more than any other cause, keeps us back in the career of improvement. It stifles industry and represses enterprize—it is fatal to economy and providence—it discourages skill—impairs our strength as a community, and poisons morals at the fountain head. How this evil is to be encountered, how subdued, is indeed a difficult and delicate enquiry, which this is not the time to examine, nor the occasion to discuss. I felt, however, that I could not discharge my duty, without referring to this subject, as one which ought to engage the prudence moderation and firmness of those who, sooner or later, must act decisively upon it.

Gaston was appointed to the North Carolina Supreme Court in 1833; as a legislator in 1818, he had introduced the bill that established the Court as a distinct body. He held the position until his death. He wrote a decision that limited the control that slave-owners could exercise over enslaved humans. Gaston was offered but declined a nomination for election to the United States Senate in 1840, and he turned down an offer to be U.S. Attorney General under President Harrison.

Gaston won elective office on several occasions, even though the Constitution of North Carolina before 1835 seemed to prohibit it, because Gaston was a Roman Catholic. The young Rev. Andrew Byrne, later bishop of the Diocese of Little Rock, having contracted a serious illness during the course of his lengthy missionary labors, recuperated under the hospitable roof of Judge Gaston. Gaston was largely responsible, as a member of the Constitutional Convention of 1835, for removing official discrimination against Catholics from North Carolina law.

== Personal life ==
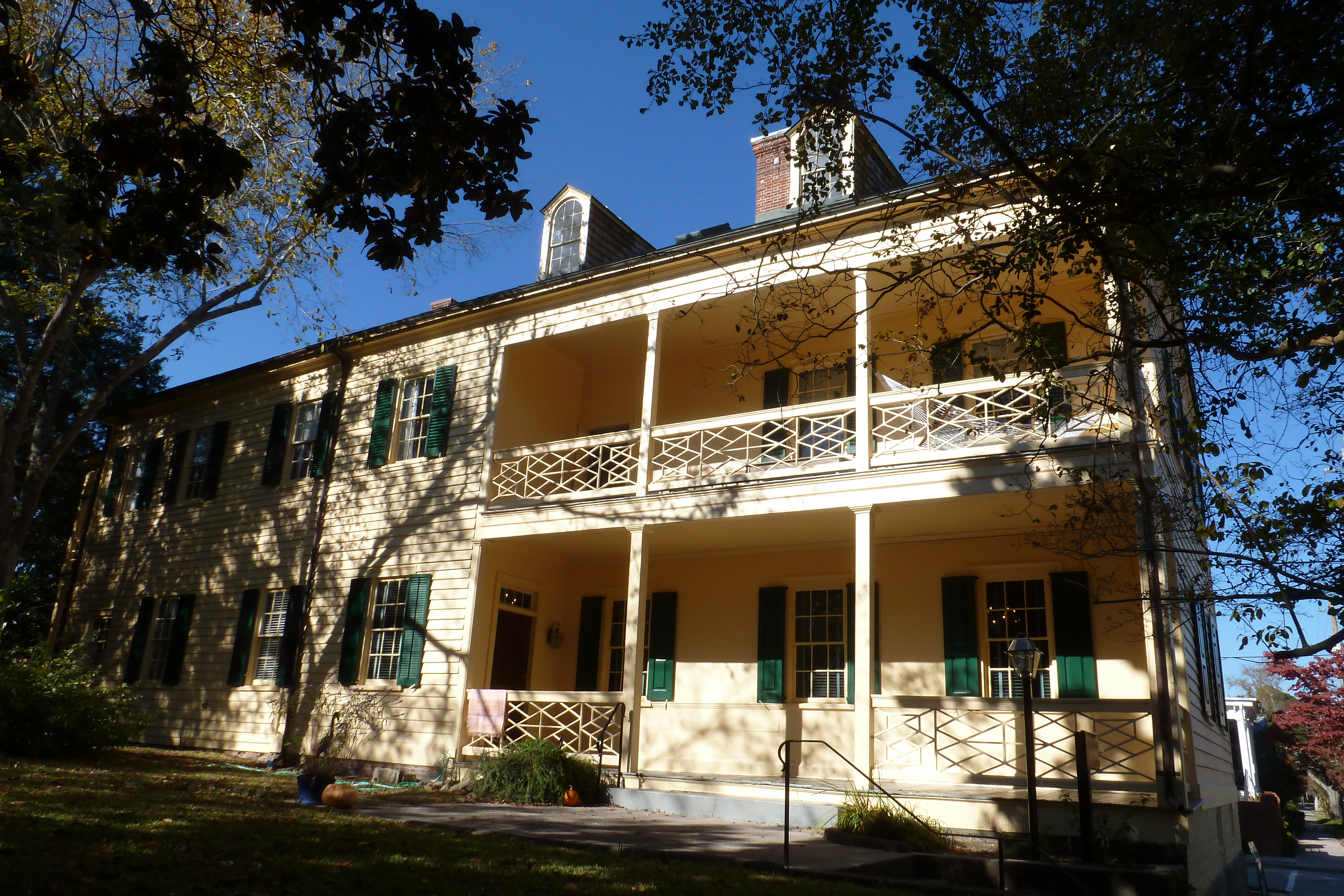
Coor-Gaston House, which he bought in 1818

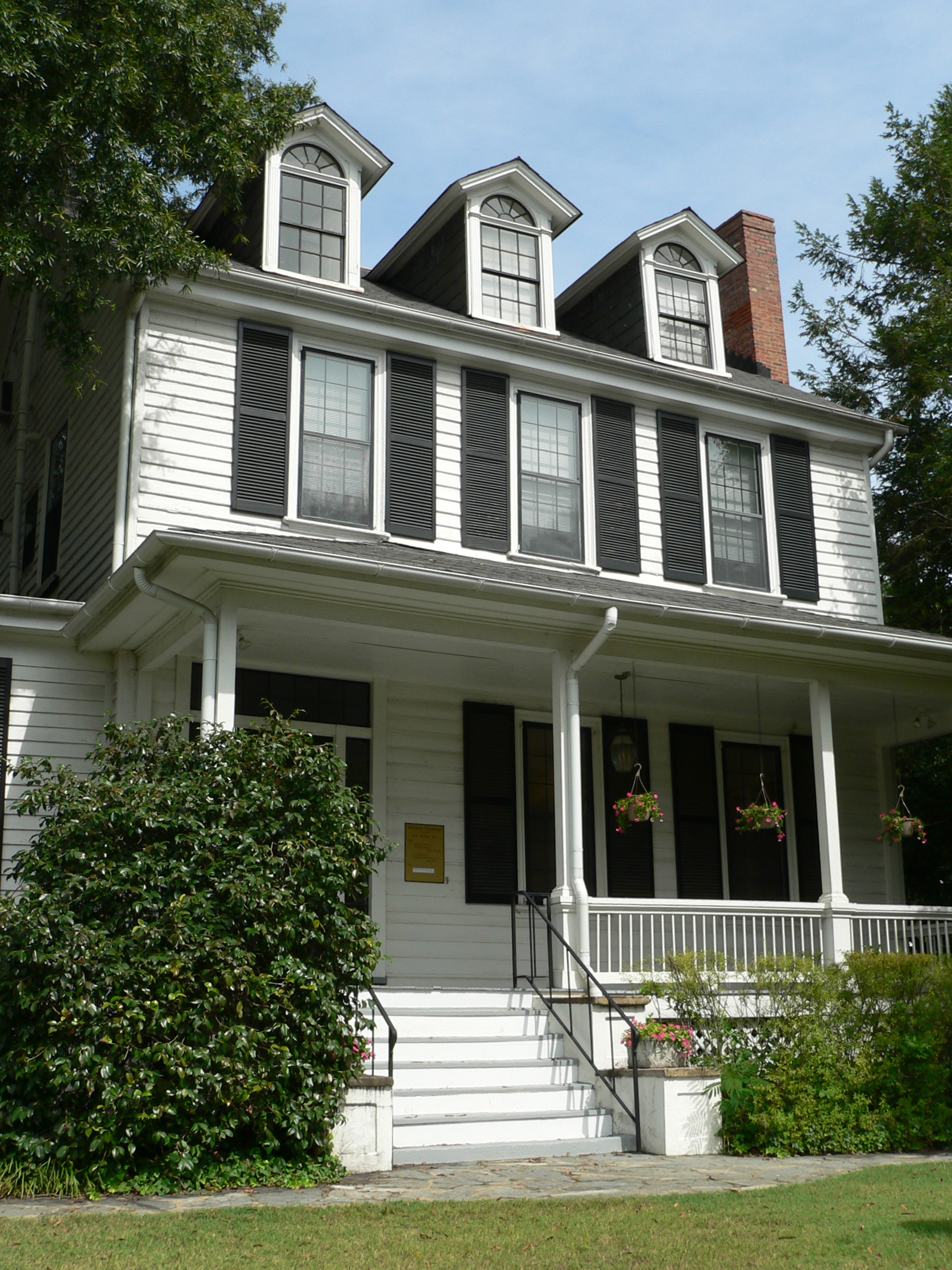
Elmwood (Raleigh, North Carolina)

Gaston married (first) on September 4, 1803, Susan Hay, who died in 1804. He married (second) on October 6, 1805, Hannah McClure, who died in 1813, and with whom he had three children:

- Alexander Gaston (1807–1848), who married Eliza W. Jones and then Sarah Lauretta Murphy.
- Susan Jane Gaston (1808–1866), who married Robert Donaldson Jr.
- Hannah Margaret Gaston (1811–1835), who married Matthias E. Manly.

Gaston married (third) on September 3, 1816, Eliza Ann Worthington, who died in 1819, and with whom he had two daughters:

- Elizabeth Gaston (1817–1874), who married George W. Graham.
- Catherine Jane Gaston (1819–1885), who did not marry.

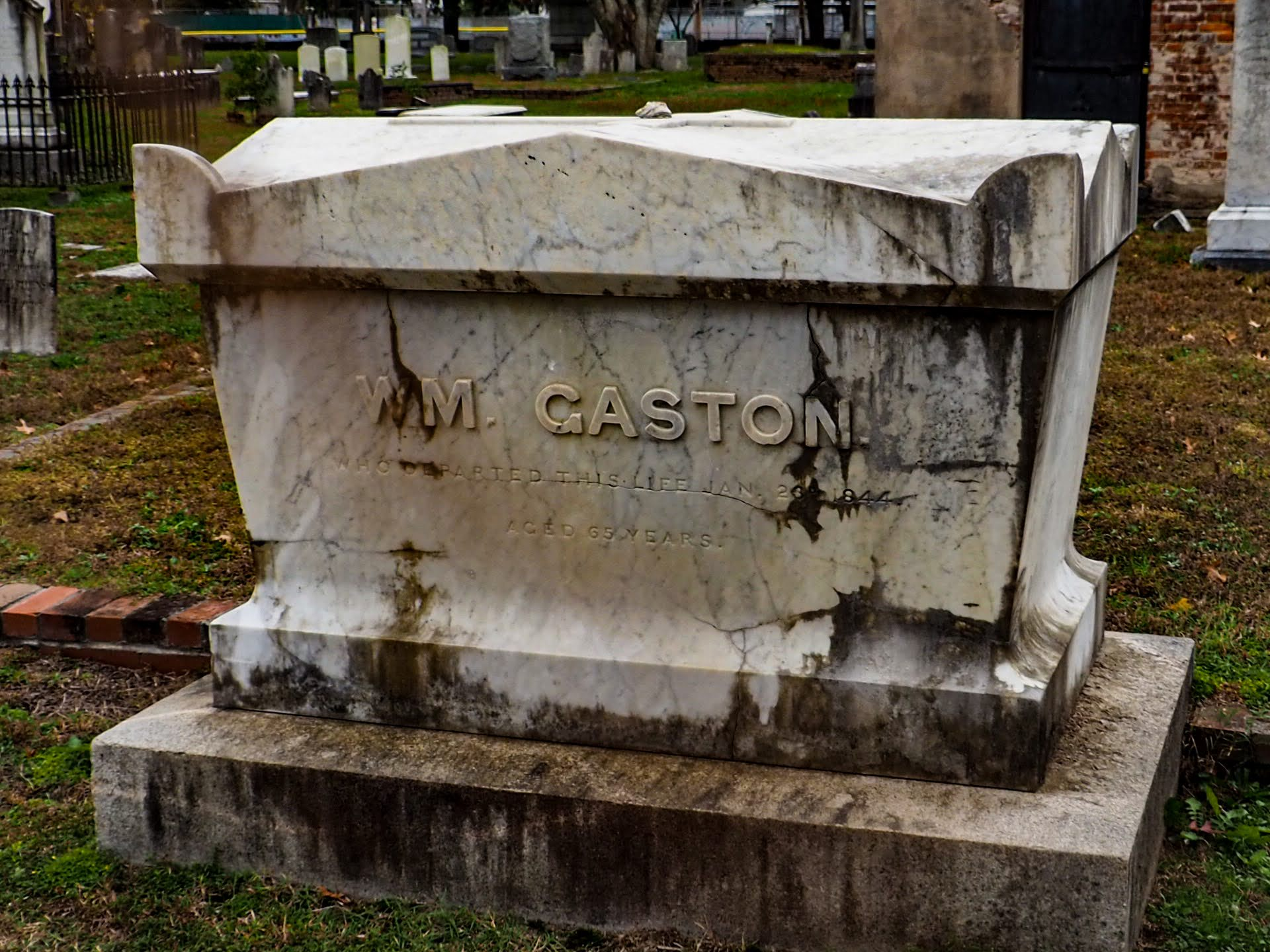
Tombstone of William Gaston

Gaston died at his office in Raleigh, North Carolina on January 23, 1844, and was buried in Cedar Grove Cemetery, New Bern, N.C. His home at New Bern, the Coor-Gaston House, was listed on the National Register of Historic Places in 1972. Elmwood, his home at Raleigh, North Carolina, was listed in 1975.

== See also ==
- Thirteenth United States Congress
- Fourteenth United States Congress

U.S. House of Representatives
Preceded by William Blackledge	Member of the U.S. House of Representatives from North Carolina's 4th congressional district 1813 – 1817	Succeeded by Jesse Slocumb
