= John Stanly =

John Stanly may refer to:

- John Stanly (politician) (1774–1834), U.S. congressman from North Carolina
- John Carruthers Stanly (1774–1845), slave owner and free black resident
- John Wright Stanly, Revolutionary War veteran and privateer, father of both the above
  - John Wright Stanly House, New Bern, Craven County, North Carolina
  - SS John Wright Stanly, a Liberty ship

== See also ==
- John Stanley (disambiguation)
