= George Peake =

George Peake may refer to:

- George Peake (clergyman) (1846–1901)
- George Peake (inventor)

== See also ==
- George Peek, American agricultural economist
- George Peak, a peak in the Raft River Mountains of Utah
