= James Davis (printer) =

First public printer to the Colony of North Carolina (1721–1785)

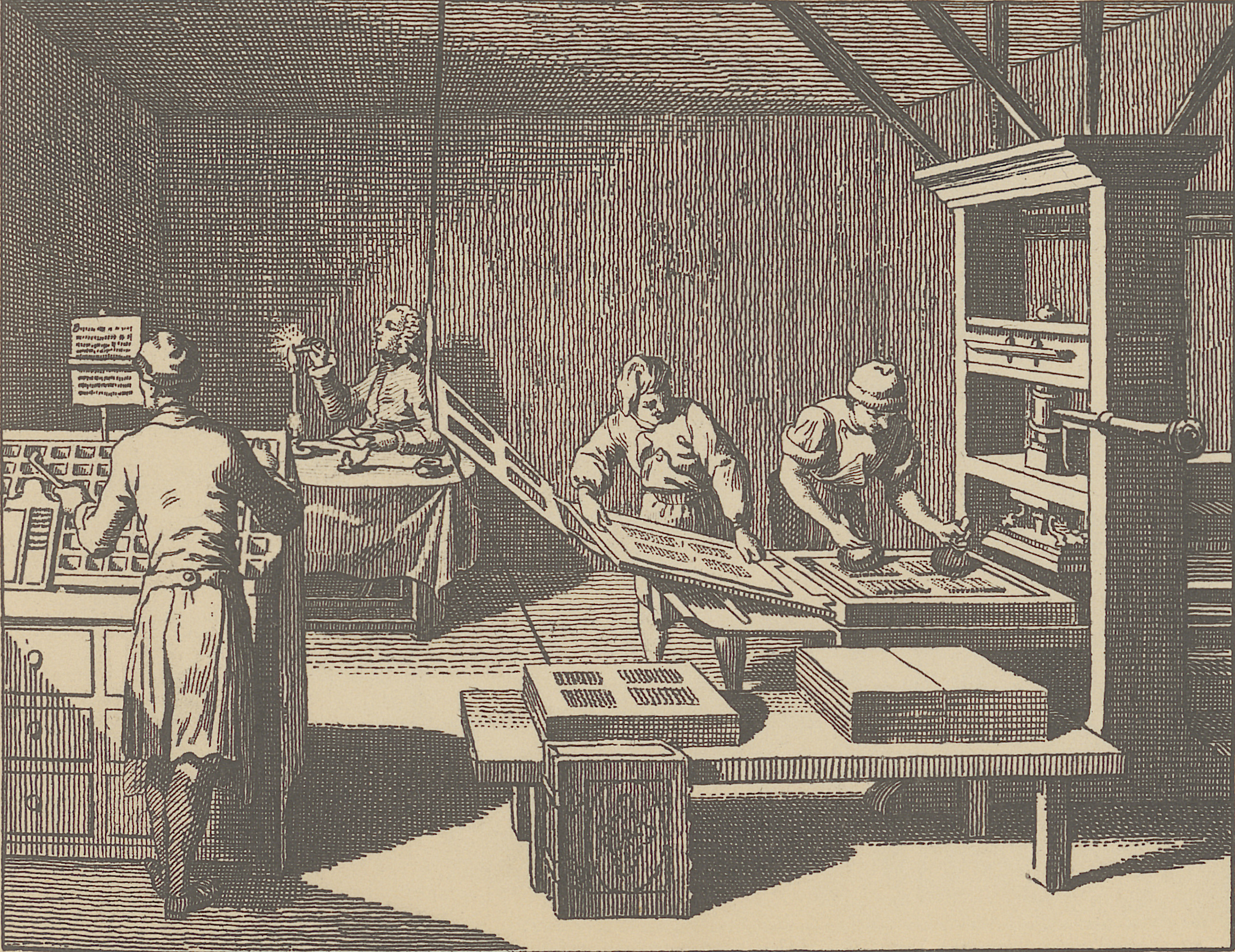
- A typical printing shop and press commonly in use during the 18th century. (Note: There are no known illustrations of James Davis.)
- Born: October 21, 1721; Colony of Virginia
- Died: 1785 (aged 63–64); New Bern, North Carolina
- Resting place: Christ Episcopal Church graveyard, New Bern
- Occupations: Printer, public servant
- Spouse: Prudence Hobbs
- Children: Four sons and three daughters

James Davis (October 21, 1721 – 1785) was an early American printer and the first printer and first postmaster of the colony of North Carolina. He was also the founder and printer of the North-Carolina Gazette, North Carolina colony's first newspaper. After working with William Parks in Virginia he removed to New Bern to pursue a printing career upon learning that an official printer was needed in that colony. Soon after his arrival he began to put down roots, married, and became active in local politics, holding several positions in public office, including membership in the North Carolina Assembly and thereafter a county Sheriff.

Davis secured the position of the official printer for the colonial government of the North Carolina colony and was first to print its laws and paper currency. As an accomplished and official printer, Davis was later suspected by some of counterfeiting monetary notes, but the allegations were made by a career criminal, himself convicted of multiple counts of counterfeiting and thievery, while facing execution, and the allegations were never substantiated. Thereafter he went on serving as the colony's official printer and as a North Carolina justice of the peace. Davis supported the cause for American independence and to this end was politically active as a printer and politician before and during the American Revolution.

== Early and family life ==
Davis was born in Virginia on October 21, 1721, but the specific location is not known. Nothing else is positively known about his early life until 1745, when he was living in Williamsburg, Virginia. (Note: A James Davis appears in the records of Bruton Parish Church, Williamsburg,) He moved to the Colony of North Carolina in New Bern in 1749, and soon married Prudence Hobbs, the widow of Christopher Gregory Hobbs and daughter of William Carruthers. Shortly after Davis married he acquired the property on the southwest corner of Broad and East Front streets in New Bern, where his printing office was located for many years. Their marriage produced four sons and three daughters. The eldest son, James, was a merchant in New Bern. The second son, John, became a ship captain, but died during the American Revolutionary War while held prisoner aboard a British ship anchored in the Charleston, South Carolina harbor. Davis' youngest son, Thomas, who was an apprentice to his father and the only son known to have followed in his father's footsteps, assisting him in his print shop until he was drafted into the Continental Army in 1778. In 1785 Thomas succeeded his father as state printer, acting in this capacity until 1785.

== Printing career ==
Monetary notes of credit. Printed by James Davis from engraved copper plates. (Note: Images are not to scale in relation to one another.)

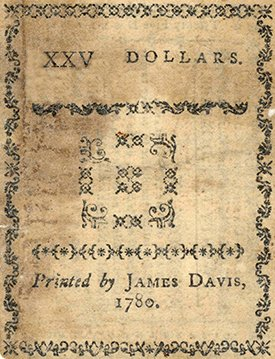
Twenty five dollar bill of credit

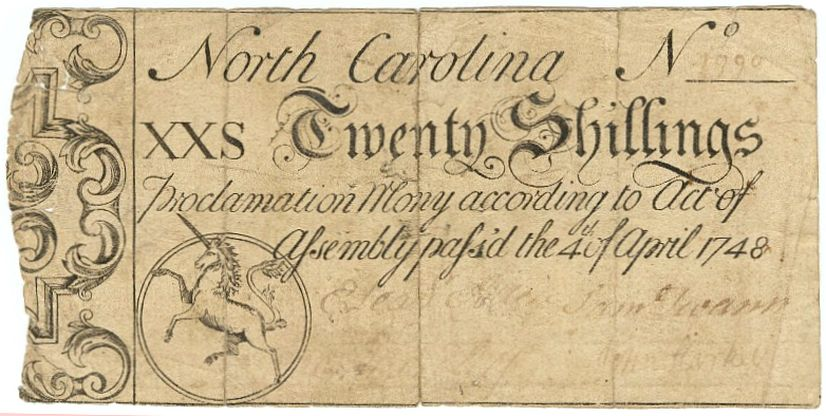
Twenty Shilling currency printed in 1748, Note is numbered 1990

North Carolina was the last colony except Georgia to receive a printer and printing press, as it was largely unsettled during the early 18th century. As Davis worked for William Parks who established the first press in Virginia in 1736, it is generally assumed by historians that he obtained his training as a printer from him, but any apprenticeship with Parks has not been conclusively established.

Upon receiving word that the North Carolina Assembly, seated in New Bern, needed an official printer to publish their laws, legislative journals and other official documents, all of which were hand-written in manuscript form and generally disorganized, Davis moved from Virginia to North Carolina with his printing press. At the age of 28, he became the first printer to set up a print shop in that colony in New Bern, situated at the mouth of the Neuse River near the coast.

One of Davis' first undertakings was to acquire property. When the Governor and Council met in April 1749, and again in autumn, Davis submitted an application to the Council for land. The Council granted him 200 acres in Johnston County and another 200 acres in Craven County. On June 24, 1749, he began setting up his print shop on Pollock Street in New Bern.

On April 4, 1748, the North Carolina General Assembly passed an act to have printed £21,350 of currency in various denominations, but no printing was forthcoming until the arrival of James Davis to New Bern. One of his first assignments as public printer was the printing of paper money (promissory notes), for the North Carolina provincial government. On October 17, 1749, several months after Davis' arrival to North Carolina, the Assembly finally passed a resolution to pay Davis a six-month advance on his salary of £80, and commissioned him to print the bills authorized the year before. Davis did not engrave the copper printing plates but was authorized to account for and handle the actual printing.

In 1751 Davis printed an edition of the Laws of North Carolina, containing five hundred and eighty pages. He was paid an annual salary of £160 proclamation money, and given copyrights on all government publications he printed. That year Davis printed Swann's Revisal, so entitled because Samuel Swann was chairman of the commission which prepared it. It became popularly known as "The Yellow Jacket" for the yellowish hue of the parchment it was printed on. This was the first book published in North Carolina.

In 1752 he relocated his shop to the corner of Front and Broad Streets. His first commission was the printing of The Journal of the House of Burgesses, September 26, 1749. Davis was considered to be a respectable man, and was given a commission as a magistrate by North Carolina's governor, William Tryon, governor of North Carolina from 1764 to 1771.

While Davis was considered a competent hard working printer there were times where he faced serious difficulties regarding his overall performance. In 1752, he was summoned by the General Assembly and charged with failing to perform his duties by not delivering various official documents printed for officials of North Carolina. In his defense he maintained that on the salary the General Assembly was paying him he could not afford the expenses needed for the time and traveling required to deliver the documents. The General Assembly, however, disagreed with his reasoning and he was subsequently fined.

Just before and during the American Revolution, paper became scarce and hence expensive, and delivery costs also rose sharply. Davis appealed to the General Assembly for more money to print North Carolina's laws but they could not pay Davis as much as the laws cost him to print, and he was forced to resign as official printer to remain solvent. After Davis had resigned, the General Assembly hired a replacement printer, but he died just a few weeks after his arrival. The Assembly searched earnestly for another replacement, but were unable to find a qualified printer who would perform his duties for the amount of money they were offering. Upon learning of the difficulties the General Assembly was facing, and feeling a patriotic duty to his country in its time of need, Davis offered to take up the state's printing once again, and was willing to accept payment whenever it was possible. Because of mounting war time debts, however, Davis did not receive payment for most of the work he performed in the following few years. Once again he had to deal financial stress, and at a time his health was worsening. Davis was forced to retire from his printing in 1782. Davis' son, Thomas, took over his father's printing business, but he died a short time later.

Over a thirty-three year period Davis printed and published books and pamphlets mostly of a legal nature. There were, however, a fair variety other topics he published. In 1753 he published a work by English missionary Clement Hall, rector of Saint Paul's Church in Edenton, entitled, A Collection of Many Christian Experiences, and Several Places of Scripture, the first non-legal book printed in North Carolina. (Note: The only known copy of the book is in the Rare Book Collection, Duke University Library, Durham, North Carolina. Clement's work was reprinted at Raleigh, State Department of Archives and History, 1961.) According to Benjamin Franklin's account books, Davis, late in 1752 and in 1753, purchased from him paper for printing, pasteboard, and parchment. North Carolina historian William S. Powell maintains that it is quite likely that Hall's work was printed with materials purchased from Franklin. Another printing by Davis, The First Book of the American Chronicles of the Times, was humorous text. He also printed and published in 1778 an introduction to Latin grammar, by Thomas Ruddiman, entitled Rudiments of the Latin Tongue, and The Spelling Dictionary, by Thomas Dyche. Davis also published various semi-public works, including his Justice of the Peace, of 1774. It was a 407 page manual and outlined the various duties and responsibilities of a Justice of the Peace, authored and printed by Davis. (Note: Davis' work also outlined the duty of sheriffs, constables, coroners, churchwardens, overseers of roads and other officers, along with precedents of warrants, judgments, executions and other legal process.)

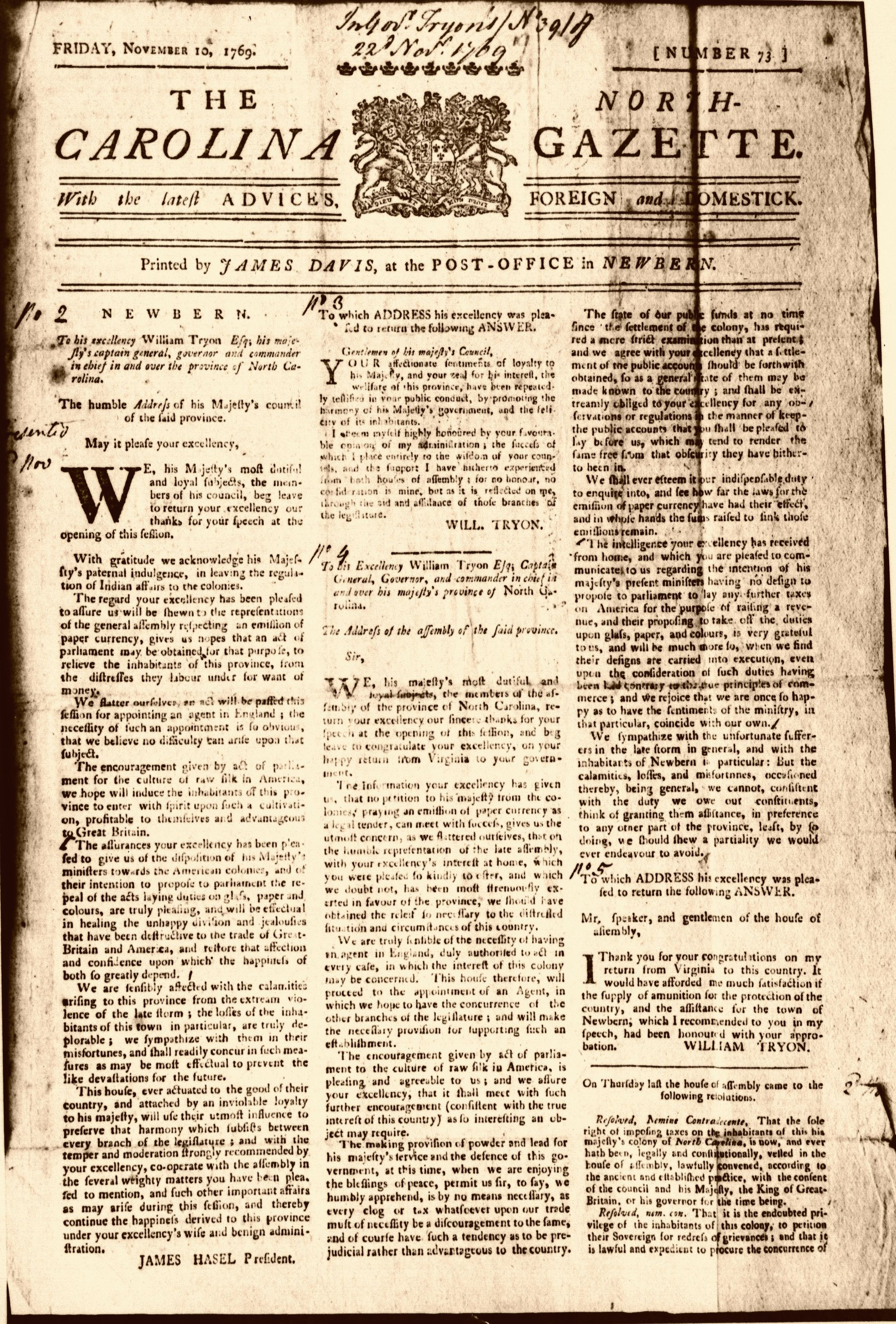
The North Carolina Gazette, November 10, 1769 issue, printed by James Davis

=== North Carolina Gazette ===
In 1751 Davis established and began the publication of the North-Carolina Gazette, North Carolina's first newspaper. The earliest known copy is dated November 15, 1751. (Note: This issue of the Gazette wasn't discovered until 1920, by Robert D. W. Connor, a historian of colonial North Carolina. Before that it was assumed the first issue of the Gazette was issued in 1755.) The Gazette was a journal like newspaper containing essays as well as the news. It was issued weekly on Thursdays and was published for approximately eight years and then discontinued for a time in 1761, though no copies after 1769 are known to exist. On the May 27, 1768, the Gazette was started up again with its publication continuing until after the commencement of the American Revolutionary War. Its front page inscription read:

New Bern: Printed by James Davis, at the Printing office in Front-street; where all persons may be supplied with this paper at Sixteen shillings per Annum: And where Advertisements of a moderate length are inserted for Three Shillings the first Week, and Two shillings for every week after. And where also Book-Binding is done reasonably.

After winning the Seven Years' War with France, England found itself heavily in debt and in 1764 began imposing a series of taxes on the colonies. The first was the American Revenue Act, followed by the Currency Act. Davis reprinted these acts in several issues of his newspaper in August 1764, coverage of which took up most of the printing space in an issue. In the August 17 issue of the Gazette he also printed a petition, which was sent to King George III, protesting England's failure to enforce an indemnity from France rather than seeking revenues from the colonists. Davis also reprinted letters that appeared in The Boston Gazette and the New Hampshire Gazette denouncing the Sugar Act and Revenue Act. In 1778 during the Revolutionary War Davis was forced to suspend publication of the Gazette when his son and assistant, Thomas Davis, was conscripted into joining the Continental Army. One North Carolina historian said that the Gazette earned Davis the title, "The Father of Journalism in North Carolina". Davis was joined by other printers in publishing North Carolina newspapers, including Andrew Steuart Boyd, a Presbyterian minister from Pennsylvania, who published Wilmington's Cape Fear Mercury in 1776.

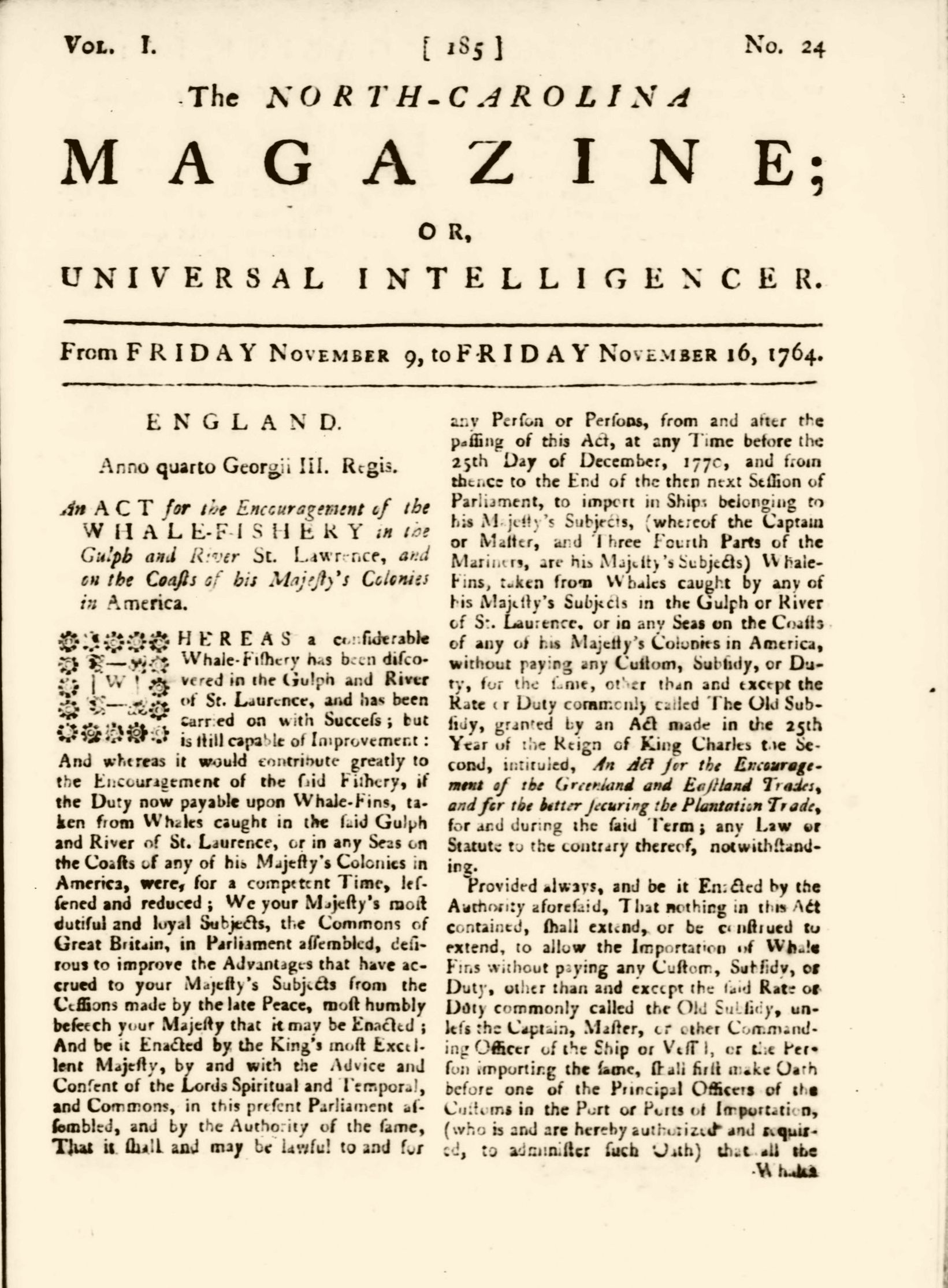
North Carolina Magazine or Universal Intelligencer, Issue for November 9–16, 1764

=== The North Carolina Magazine ===
In 1764, Davis made another journalistic effort with The North Carolina Magazine, or the Universal Intelligencer. printed on a demy sheet, in quarto pages. The first issue was dated Friday, June 1, to Friday, June 8, 1764. The price per issue was four pence: By the end of that year the size of the paper was reduced by about a half, but its price remained the same. Its news was dated and mostly that of England and Europe and often contained extracts from theological publications taken from various English works and magazines. It is not known how long exactly the Magazine remained in publication but evidently this publication, as it were, was not nearly as successful as the first, for on May 27, 1768, Davis revived The North Carolina Gazette. No issues of The North-Carolina Magazine are known to have survived after January 18, 1765.

=== Counterfeiting allegations ===
The numerous laws against counterfeiting during the years leading up to the American Revolution indicates that this activity occurred often enough in the colonies to warrant their numbers. Several colonies, including Virginia and North Carolina, regarded counterfeiting as an act of treason, where the penalty of death was provided. In 1768 Davis was again commissioned by the North Carolina General Assembly to print £20,000 in paper notes. When counterfeit notes turned up in 1770, printed with the same type Davis had used in 1768, Davis and the two men who had assisted him in the printing, James Mansfield and Samuel Robert Hall, were interrogated by the North Carolina colonial authorities. The counterfeit notes were so well printed that it was assumed by some that the notes were printed either in Williamsburg, Virginia, or in Davis' own printing shop in New Bern. Davis pointed out that when his shop was destroyed in the hurricane of 1769 he had lost sufficient type for someone to reproduce the notes. The investigation, however, failed to establish any culpability involving Davis and his printing shop. Davis soon faced another challenge to his reputation in 1773. Spencer Dew, convicted of a litany of counterfeiting and thievery crimes, and facing execution, accused Davis of printing and giving him £1,000 in counterfeit notes, and that Davis had also given £2,000 in bogus notes to James Coor, a prominent New Bern resident. It is unclear if Dew's allegations (Note: Dew's accusations implemented a good number of other men and were made in a lengthy confession just before his execution. He confessed to operating with several different accomplices, involving several cases of passing counterfeit notes and dozens of crimes involving the theft of live stock and the theft of cash and goods from numerous homes and shops. Dew was hanged on August 2, 1772 in Duplin County.) were an attempt to discredit Davis, who was also the North Carolina justice of the peace, but the allegations could not be substantiated and the long time established reputations of Davis and Coor remained intact. Davis was reappointed public printer in 1774 and continued to serve as Justice of the Peace in New Bern until 1778.

== Political career ==
Acts of the North Carolina Assembly
original, 1751 — revised, 1773
printed by James Davis

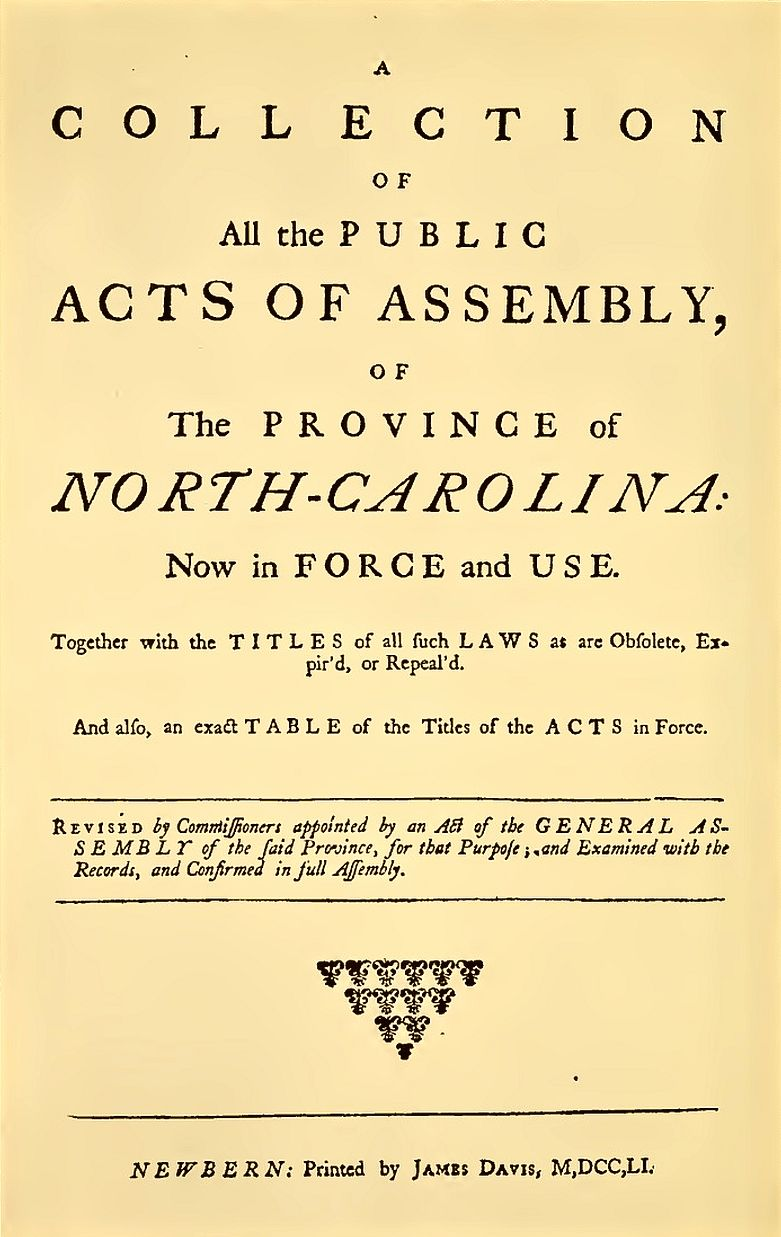
A Collection of All the Public Acts of Assembly, of the Province of North Carolina: Now in Force and Use, 1751

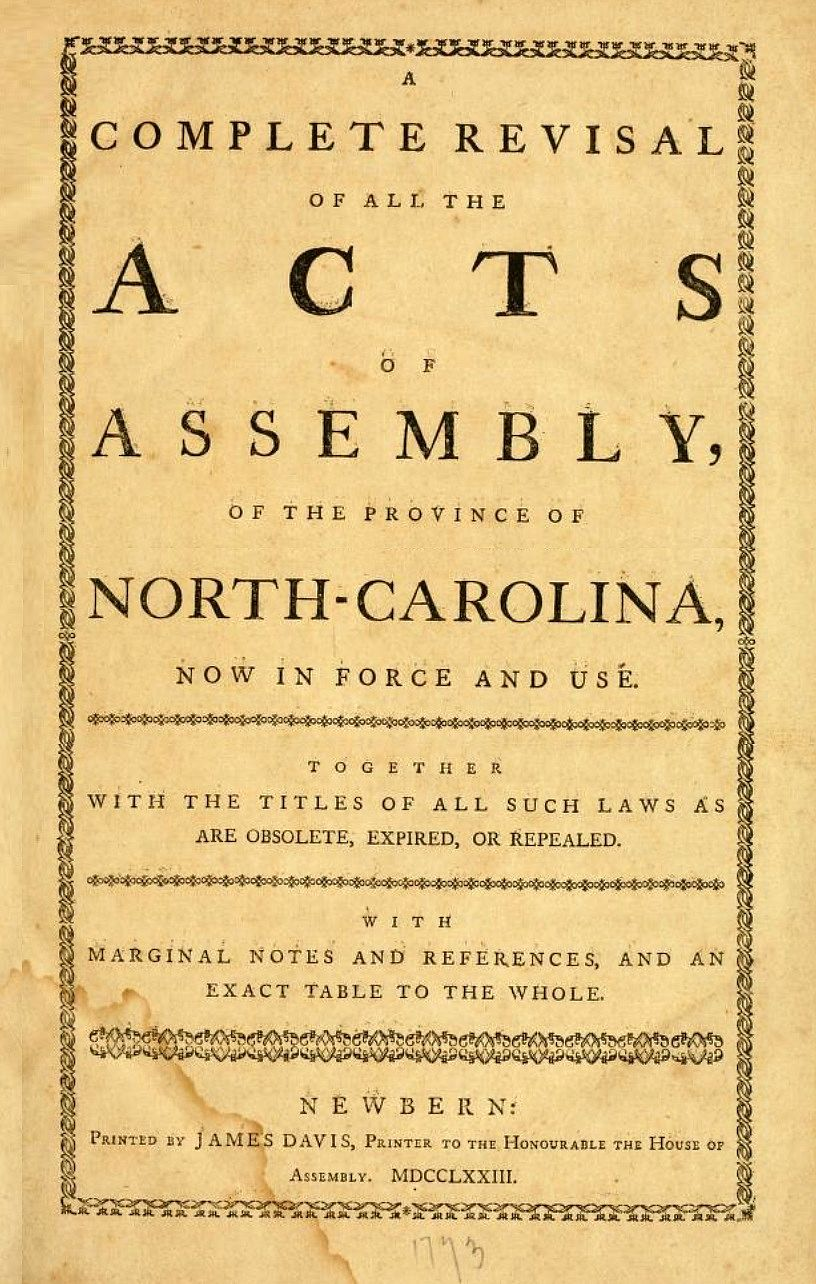
A complete revisal of all the acts of Assembly ..., 1773

Davis became a member of the county court in 1753 and held that office for twenty-five years. In 1754 he was elected sheriff of Craven County, but after ten months he chose to resign when he was selected as a representative in New Bern in the Assembly. He was denied that seat out of the Assembly's concern that his dual office holding as Sheriff would compromise his capacity to function in the Assembly. (Note: The house had declared that Davis was illegally elected. His supporters, however, presented another petition to the assembly saying that they had voted for Davis while ignorant of the fact that his being sheriff would render him ineligible, and if he should be expelled, they desired that a new writ of election be issued.) In 1755, however, he was elected to the North Carolina Assembly, representing Craven County, where he served until 1760.

In 1755 Benjamin Franklin, the Postmaster-General for the American colonies, appointed Davis as the first postmaster of North Carolina at New Bern. In October of that year the North Carolina Assembly awarded him the contract to carry the mail between Wilmington, North Carolina and Suffolk, Virginia.

While Davis was mostly committed to public service he still pursued some private interests. In 1764 he established and owned a sawmill on Slocumb's Creek, and posted advertisements for a manager who could operate it while he was committed to his public service involvements. He also advertised for a millwright who could manage the building and operation of another such mill which included a dam used to power the mill.

Davis once again printed for the North Carolina Assembly, in 1773, a 575 page work entitled, A complete revisal of all the acts of Assembly, of the province of North-Carolina, now in force and use. It was printed in a variety of type faces and was one of the largest works he ever printed.

During the years leading up to the American Revolution, Davis allied himself with the revolutionary cause and printed articles and essays promoting American independence and the revolution. He also became involved with the Council of Safety of New Bern and became a member when that council was founded and began representing New Bern in the Provincial Congress. Davis performed many patriotic duties, including his signing of the Craven County Address on Liberty, in 1774, and became a committee member which served in the arming and supplying of ships for war, among other such war-time efforts. In 1777, the North Carolina Assembly appointed him as one of the judges on the Admiralty Court for the port of Beauford. Beginning in 1768 Davis served as Justice of the Peace in New Bern and held that post until 1778. The high point of his political career occurred in 1781 when Davis became a member of the Council of State.

== Final days and legacy ==
Two years after Davis resumed publication of the North Carolina Gazette he fell into ill health and died in February 1785 at the age of 64. Davis left a will which was probated in the Craven County court in March 1785, which would support the idea that he very likely died the previous month. Davis died a wealthy man, leaving behind a great deal of property he had acquired over the course of his life. His business partner, Robert Keith, continued publication of the North Carolina Gazette, but changed its name to The Impartial Intelligencer and Weekly General Advertiser. The Intelligencer, however, offered little of state or local news. The last issue was published on September 2, 1784. Although Davis' North Carolina Gazette only lasted for a relatively short period the newspaper served as a catalyst for the establishment of other newspapers in North Carolina. His service as public printer lasted more than thirty years. Davis's greatest legacy was that he was North Carolina's first printer and publisher of over one hundred titles. By the late-eighteenth century, newspapers were appearing in Raleigh, Hillsborough, and Salisbury. James Davis is buried at Christ Episcopal Church, in New Bern, on Pollack Street, the same street where his first printing shop was located.

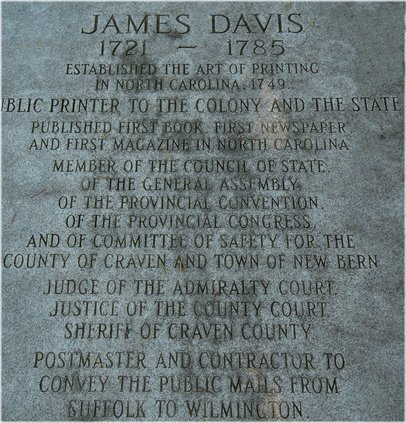
James Davis tombstone at Christ Episcopal Church, with titles and accomplishments inscribed thereon

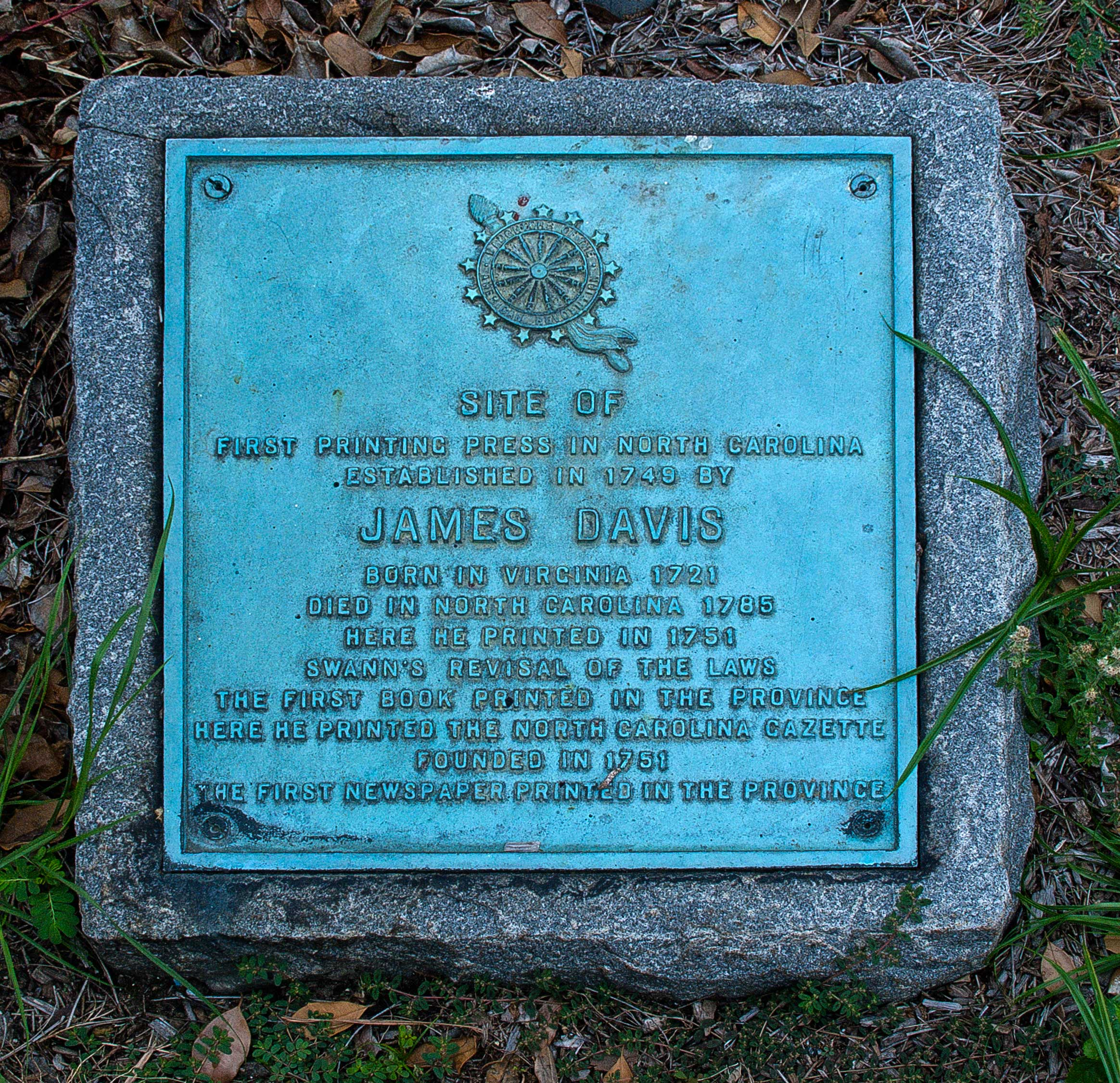
Bronze historical plaque, marking location of Davis' print shop in North Carolina, New Bern.

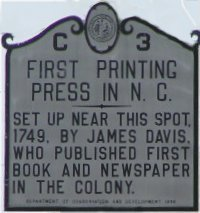
Road side historical marker at the former location of first printing press and shop in North Carolina, New Bern.

On November 20, 1925 The Richard Dobbs Spaight chapter of the Daughters of the American Revolution erected a bronze historical plaque mounted on a block of granite at the site where Davis established the first printing press in North Carolina in New Bern. The plaque commemorates James Davis as the first printer of North Carolina and the first to establish a newspaper in that state, among other such notable accomplishments. Colonial North Carolina historian, Samuel Ashe, said of Davis, that he was "practically the history of the North Carolina press for the first generation of its existence".

During the course of his printing career, Davis had printed more than one hundred pamphlets, books, and newspaper broadsides, most of them at the request of the North Carolina government. Historian and archivist Robert Connor referred to Davis as "the father of journalism in North Carolina".

== See also ==
- List of early American publishers and printers
- History of North Carolina
- History of American newspapers

== Bibliography ==
- Ashe, Samuel A'Court (1905). Biographical history of North Carolina from colonial times to the present. Vol. VIII. Greensboro, N.C., C.L. Van Noppen.
- Crittenden, Christopher, ed. (1944). North Carolina Historical Review. Vol. XXI, 1–4 . State Department of Archives and History, Raleigh, North Carolina.
- Connor, Robert Digges Wimberly (1919). History of North Carolina. Vol. I. Chicago : New York : Lewis Publishing Co.
- Corbitt, D. L. (January 1925). "The North Carolina Gazette". The North Carolina Historical Review. II (1). North Carolina Office of Archives and History: 83–86. JSTOR 23514408.
- Davis, James, ed. (1773). A complete revisal of all the acts of Assembly, of the province of North-Carolina, now in force and use ... Newbern : Printed by James Davis, printer to the Honourable House of Assembly.
- Davis, James (1774). The office and authority of a justice of the peace. New Bern, NC, James Davis; Open Library. OL 15498756M.
- Elliott, Robert N. Jr. (January 1965). "James Davis and the Beginning of the Newspaper in North Carolina". The North Carolina Historical Review. XLII (1). North Carolina Office of Archives and History: 1–20. JSTOR 23517809.
- Houston, Claudia (May 27, 2020). "This Month in New Bern History: James Davis". New Bern Magazine.
- Hudson, Frederic (1873). Journalism in the United States, from 1690 to 1872. New York, Harper & Brothers.
- Martin, François Xavier (1829). The history of North Carolina from the earliest period. Vol. II. New Orleans : A.T. Penniman.
- Lee, James Melvin (1923). History of American journalism. Boston, New York, Houghton Mifflin Company. (Alternative publication)
- Nettels, Curtis (January 1934). "The Origins of Paper Money in the English Colonies". Economic History. III (9). Royal Economic Society: 35–56. JSTOR 45366422.
- The North Carolina Historical Review (1924). The North Carolina Historical Review, January – October, 1926. Vol. III. Raleigh : North Carolina Historical Commission.
- —— (1924). The North Carolina Historical Review, January – October, 1927. Vol. IV. Raleigh : North Carolina Historical Commission.
- —— (1924). The North Carolina Historical Review, January – October, 1928. Vol. V. Raleigh : North Carolina Historical Commission.
- —— (1950). The North Carolina Historical Review, January – October, 1950. Vol. XXVII. Raleigh: State Department of Archives and History.
- Powell, William S. (2000). Powell, William S. (ed.). Dictionary of North Carolina biography. Vol. II. University of North Carolina Press. ISBN 978-0-8078-6701-3. - Alternative link to Davis biography
- Reavis, Scott Aaron (2000). JAMES DAVIS: NORTH CAROLINA'S FIRST PRINTER (PDF) (Master of Arts). University of North Carolina.
- Scott, Kenneth (January 1953). "Counterfeiting in Colonial Virginia". The Virginia Magazine of History and Biography. LXI (1). Virginia Historical Society: 3–33. JSTOR 4245899.
- Thornton, Mary Linsday (July 1944). "Public Printing in North Carolina, 1749–1815". North Carolina Historical Review. XXI (3): 181–202.
- Thomas, Isaiah (1874). The history of printing in America, with a biography of printers. Vol. I. New York, B. Franklin.
- —— (1874). The history of printing in America, with a biography of printers. Vol. II. New York, B. Franklin.
- Valentine, Patrick M. (July 2005). "Libraries and Print Culture in Early North Carolina". The North Carolina Historical Review. LXXXII (3). North Carolina Office of Archives and History: 293–325. JSTOR 23523028.
- Watson, Alan D. (April 2002). "Counterfeiting in Colonial North Carolina: A Reassessment". The North Carolina Historical Review. LXXIX (2). North Carolina Office of Archives and History: 182–197. JSTOR 23522766.
- Weeks, Stephen Beauregard (1891). The press of North Carolina in the eighteenth century. Brooklyn, Historical printing club.
- Williams, Shane (2016). "The North Carolina Gazette". John Locke Foundation.
- Wroth, Lawrence C. (1938). The Colonial Printer. Portland, Me., The Southworth-Anthoensen press.
