= Henry Ephraim Scott =

Henry Ephraim Scott (October 24, 1846 – ?) was an American politician.

== Early life ==
Henry Ephraim Scott was born on October 24, 1846 in Geauga County, Ohio, United States. While some historians have described him as black, historian Benjamin R. Justesen writes that Scott's race is "conclusively established as white" by his research. He was educated in Ripon, Wisconsin.

During the American Civil War, Scott served under General Philip Sheridan in the Federal Army in the Shenandoah Valley. In August 1865 he moved to Wilmington, North Carolina.

== Political career ==
Scott was a member of the Republican Party. Under North Carolina's provisional government established in wake of the war, he was appointed magistrate and served in that capacity until February 1879. He was also elected justice of the peace in 1874. In 1879 he was elected to the North Carolina House of Representatives and served on its Private Bills, Agriculture, and Public Printing committees. From 1881 to 1884 he served in the North Carolina Senate. He later became a temperance advocate.

== Works cited ==
- Justesen, Benjamin R. (July 2009). "'The Class of '83': Black Watershed in the North Carolina General Assembly". The North Carolina Historical Review. 86 (3): 282–308. ISSN 0029-2494. JSTOR 23523861.
- Justesen, Benjamin R. (2012). George Henry White: An Even Chance in the Race of Life (reprint ed.). Baton Rouge: Louisiana State University Press. ISBN 9780807144770.
- Tomlinson, J. S. (1879). Tar Heel sketch-book. A brief biographical sketch of the life and public acts of the members of the General Assembly of North Carolina. Session of 1879. Raleigh, North Carolina: Raleigh News Steam Book and Job Office – via Internet Archive.
- Reaves, William M. (1998). Strength Through Struggle: The Chronological and Historical Record of the African-American Community in Wilmington, North Carolina, 1865-1950. New Hanover Public Library. ISBN 9780967041001.
