= Donum =

Donum may refer to:

- Dunam or Donum, a unit of area
- Regium Donum, funds for clergy
- Gift in Latin
- Donum Montford (1771–1838), American brickmason
