= John Patterson Green =

American politician (1845–1940)

- Born: April 2, 1845; New Bern, North Carolina, US
- Died: September 1, 1940 (aged 95); Cleveland, Ohio, US
- Education: Ohio State and Union Law College
- Occupations: attorney and politician
- Known for: Labor Day in Ohio
- Spouses: Annie Laura Walker Green; Lottie Mitchell Richardson Green

John Patterson Green (April 2, 1845 – September 1, 1940) was an African-American attorney, politician, public servant, and writer. He was among the first African Americans to hold public office in Cleveland, Ohio. A Republican, he was elected as a Justice of the Peace in 1873. He served in the Ohio House of Representatives in 1882. In 1891, he was elected to the Ohio Senate, the first African American state senator in Ohio. Green introduced the legislation that established Labor Day in Ohio as a state holiday.

== Early life and education ==
Green was born in New Bern, North Carolina, to John Rice Green and Temperance Dirden Green, who were both free persons of color of mixed ancestry. Greene's father was a tailor and his mother was a seamstress. At the age of five, Green and his two sisters were left to the care of their mother when their father died in 1850. Unable to sufficiently provide for her children in North Carolina, Green's mother in 1857 decided to relocate to Cleveland, Ohio, which promised greater educational and economic opportunities. In Cleveland, liberal white community leaders mostly of New England origin encouraged tolerance, racial fairness, and integration even during the antebellum times. In 1865, the Cleveland Leader wrote that, "an indication of the civilized spirit of the city of Cleveland is found in the fact that colored children attend our schools, colored people are permitted to attend all public lectures and public affairs where the fashion and culture of the city congregate, and nobody is offended." Cleveland at that time already had a small cadre of prominent black citizens, such as George Peake, land developer and inventor; Madison Tilly, an excavating contractor; Dr. Robert Boyd Leach, a physician; John Brown, the proprietor of the barber shop in one of Cleveland's finest hotels, the New England House; and Freeman H. Morris, an owner of tailoring establishment, among others. However, the largest proportion of African American population of the city (in 1870, the black population of Cleveland was about 1,300, or 1.4% of the 93,000 city dwellers) worked as unskilled laborers and domestic servants.

Green attended local grammar and high schools which were already integrated in Cleveland, making parallel efforts to help his struggling family by working odd jobs; he was an errand boy, and in 1862 became a hotel waiter. He continued to study on his own, and in an unusual attempt to secure funds for his further education wrote and published at his own expense a thirty-eight page pamphlet, Miscellaneous Subjects by a Self-Educated Colored Youth (1866). He sold near 1,500 copies in Ohio, Pennsylvania and New York. Green completed a four-year classical program at Cleveland Central Catholic High School in two years. He graduated ahead of class becoming a Valedictorian. After high school, Greene enrolled in Ohio State and Union Law College in Cleveland, graduating in 1870.

== Career ==
Looking for a place to establish a successful legal practice, Green moved with his family, first, to North Carolina, and then, to Bennettsville, South Carolina, where he stayed from 1870 to 1872. On September 20, 1870, Green passed the South Carolina bar and started to practice criminal law. In 1872, Green was elected a delegate to the South Carolina Republican convention where he became an alternate delegate to the National Republican Convention.

In the Fall of 1872, Green returned to Cleveland where he was elected as a Justice of the Peace for Cuyahoga County, Ohio by a majority of 3,000 votes; he served three terms deciding close to 12,000 cases.

In 1877, he lost a highly contested election to the Ohio House of Representatives by sixty two votes. In 1881 Green ran again, and this time he won. He lost in 1883, but won in 1889. In 1890, he sponsored legislation introducing Labor Day in Ohio as a state holiday. In 1891, Green was elected to the Ohio Senate by mostly white voters. He supported state funding for Wilberforce University, an institution affiliated with the African Methodist Episcopal Church, and helped to defeat attempts to allow local school districts to practice racial segregation.

Being a loyal Republican, Green, as a traveling speaker, took an active part in William McKinley's presidential campaign of 1896. His efforts were appreciated and in 1897 he was awarded with a newly created position of U.S. Postage Stamp Agent in Washington, D.C., with an annual salary of 2,500, serving in 1897–1905. In 1906, he briefly served as the acting superintendent of finance in the United States Post Office Department.

Green was a well regarded criminal attorney in Cleveland with clients coming "mostly from the working class of both races." In 1897, in a notable case, Green defended in Charleston, West Virginia a black servant who acted in self-defense, but was charged with assault.

== Later life ==
Green continued to practice the law in his later years, but majorly withdrew from participation in community organizations and activities. In 1920, he finished his autobiography, Fact Stranger than Fiction (1926), which he dedicated to the African American youth.

In 1928, Green addressed the Republican National Convention in Chicago asking black voters to support the Republican party.

He died after being struck by a motorist in Cleveland after stepping down from a streetcar; at the time of his death he was one of the oldest practicing attorneys in Ohio. Green is buried in Woodland Cemetery in Cleveland, Ohio.

Green was a founding member of St. Andrew's Episcopal Church in Cleveland.

== Family ==
Green married Annie Laura Walker Green after graduation from high school in 1869. Four of their children lived to adulthood: William R. Green (1873-), who became Cleveland NAACP President, Theodore B. Green (1877–1917), Jessie Bishop Green (1880–1963) and Clara Green. After his wife died in January 1912, he married a widow, Lottie Mitchell Richardson, in September 1912, they had two children. He is the great nephew of John Carruthers Stanly.

== Legacy ==
The Cleveland Leader characterized Green in 1902 as a self-made man. After coming to Cleveland at the age of twelve, he used available educational opportunities as a social lift and later employed politics as a tool of upward mobility, eventually becoming a prominent figure in Ohio Republican Party. Green was the second African American to serve in the Ohio House of Representatives and the first to serve in the Ohio Senate in the state history.

Along with Charles W. Chesnutt and Harry C. Smith, another conservative African-American community leaders in Cleveland, Green promoted social and cultural integration of black Clevelanders and stood against emerging social and cultural trends of separatism brought about by the changing economic conditions and social attitudes on race in the United States. Similar to Booker T. Washington, he saw the path to racial equality in cultivation of classic American virtues of thrift and perseverance. However, Green is criticized by historians for silence and inactivity during increasing racial oppression and disfranchisement of the African-Americans in the South at the turn of the century, despite having access to many prominent political and social leaders, such as Marcus Alonzo Hanna, William McKinley, and John D. Rockefeller, among others.

In Ohio, Green is remembered for introducing a bill to Ohio legislature that established the Labor Day as a state holiday in 1890; he was dubbed, Ohio's Father of Labor Day. After Labor Day was adopted as a national, legal holiday in 1894, he sometimes referred to as the Father of Labor Day. In 1968, W. Willard Wirtz declared that official position of the United States Department of Labor was to credit Matthew Maguire, a machinist from the Knights of Labor, with proposing the Labor Day in 1882.

In 1937, in recognition of his service to the people of Cleveland, 4 April was designated as "John P. Green Day" by the mayor and city council of Cleveland.

== Works ==
- Miscellaneous Subjects by a Self-Educated Colored Youth. Cleveland, 1866.
- Recollections of the Inhabitants, Localities, Superstitions, and KuKlux Outrages of the Carolinas. By a "Carpet-Bagger" Who Was Born and Lived There. Cleveland, 1880.
- Fact Stranger Than Fiction: Seventy-five Years of a Busy Life, with Reminiscences, of Many Great and Good Men and Women. Cleveland: Riehl Printing Co, 1920.
