= Teddy Shapou =

American fighter pilot

- Captain Teddy Shapou in 1943
- Born: 7 January 1919; Lawrence, Massachusetts, US
- Died: 17 May 1985 (aged 66); New Bern, North Carolina, US
- Military career
- Allegiance: United States
- Branch: United States Army Air Forces
- Rank: Captain
- Unit: 74th Fighter Squadron
- Conflicts: World War II
- Awards: Silver Star; Distinguished Flying Cross; Air Medal

Theodore Roosevelt Shapou (January 7, 1919 – May 17, 1985) was an American fighter pilot of World War II.

Born in Lawrence, Massachusetts in 1919 to Lebanese-American parents, he grew up in New Bern, North Carolina with his three sisters. He first attended North Carolina State University in Raleigh, North Carolina, then transferred to Georgetown College in Kentucky to be closer to his future wife. He starred in football and baseball, and studied zoology and botany before dropping out to join the United States Army Air Forces. In a War Department document dated September 26, 1941, he is listed as a second lieutenant and pilot in the Air Corps Reserve.

He was first assigned to a pursuit group in Puerto Rico before joining the 14th Air Force in China as a fighter pilot. He served with the 74th Fighter Squadron in the China Burma India Theater. He was awarded at the same ceremony the Silver Star, Distinguished Flying Cross, and the Air Medal "for combat flying in China." He is said to have shot down several Zeros and assisted with downing a Mitsubishi bomber. His photograph was auctioned in New Bern for war bonds for $8,500. He reached the rank of captain. After the war, he worked in the civil service at the Marine Corps Air Station Cherry Point, Havelock, North Carolina.

He was married to Kathleen Jones in 1942. They had two daughters, Marilyn and Janis Claire, who was named to honor General Claire Chennault. The Shapous were members of St. Paul Catholic Church.

Captain Shapou died May 17, 1985, in New Bern.
