= Donum Montford =

American brickmason (1771–1838)

Donum Montford (1771–1838) was an American brickmason and builder who was active in New Bern, North Carolina, during the early 19th century. An African-American slave, he purchased his own freedom with the help of John Carruthers Stanly in 1804, and went on to have a successful building career. He had large numbers of apprentices, including many enslaved artisans under his ownership. The exact projects he and his company worked on are unknown, although he supplied bricks and assisted in the construction of the Craven County Jail.

== Biography ==
Donum Montford (also spelled Mumford or Montfort) was born into slavery in 1771; no information about his family or parents is known. He was initially the slave of Richard Cogdell, a local politician who served as the chairman of New Bern's Committee of Safety during the American Revolution and as a member of the North Carolina House of Representatives from 1778 to 1779. As a slave, Montford learned the brickmaking, plastering, and bricklaying trades. Cogdell bequeathed Montford to his wife Lydia for her lifetime, upon which he would pass to the ownership of their daughter Lydia Badger. Under Lydia Cogdell's ownership, Montford continued his brickmasonry work, likely saving up money in an aim to purchase his freedom.

Legal barriers prevented slaves from directly purchasing their own freedom. Montford worked with a prominent mixed-race freedman, John Carruthers Stanly, to purchase and emancipate him. He was likely assisted by Stanly's White half-brother John Stanly — Lydia Cogdell's nephew — an attorney who had previously defended Free Black clients and had emancipated several of his own slaves. On September 10, 1804, Lydia Cogdell and Badger sold Montford, recorded in the deed as a "mulatto boy slave named Donum", to Stanly for $500. Stanly freed him the following day.

=== Career ===
Montford began his own bricklaying shop soon after his emancipation. In 1806, Lydia Cogdell — likely to avoid the legal uncertainty of emancipation via will — gifted him his nephew as a slave, an eleven-year-old named Abram Moody Russell. The deed specified that Abram would stay with Montford as an apprentice in masonry and plastering until he was 26. She died a month later. Montford took his first free apprentice in 1807.

Montford was successful in his career. He began purchasing land in the early 1810s, and amassed a real estate portfolio of several houses, town lots, and a farm. He additionally owned a large number of slaves; he reported employing twenty-two slaves in the 1820 census, although it is unknown how many he personally owned. He employed both free and enslaved artisans and apprentices. One of his enslaved apprentices was his only son Nelson. Anxious that his son might fall into inescapable slavery upon his death, he put up large amounts of money for manumission bond, freeing him in 1828. Several years later, the state legislature enacted new laws which prevented slaveowners from freeing their own family members. Nelson was one of two slaves that Montford freed in his lifetime, alongside his nephew Abram.

The projects which Montford and his company worked on are largely unknown. He supplied a quarter of the 400,000 bricks used to construct the Craven County Jail, and worked alongside his artisans lathing and plastering for the structure. Outside of New Bern, he delivered bricks and constructed a foundation for a Tyrrell County planter. Montford and his wife Hannah were both members of New Bern's Christ Episcopal Church, for which he was tasked to inspect for repairs.

Montford died in 1838. He willed to his wife a large amount of property, including a house, a family bible, large quantities of Liverpool porcelain, a portrait of Napoleon, and six slaves. Only one of these, Isaac Rue, was set to be freed upon Hannah's death.
