= North Carolina Gazette =

First newspaper published in North Carolina

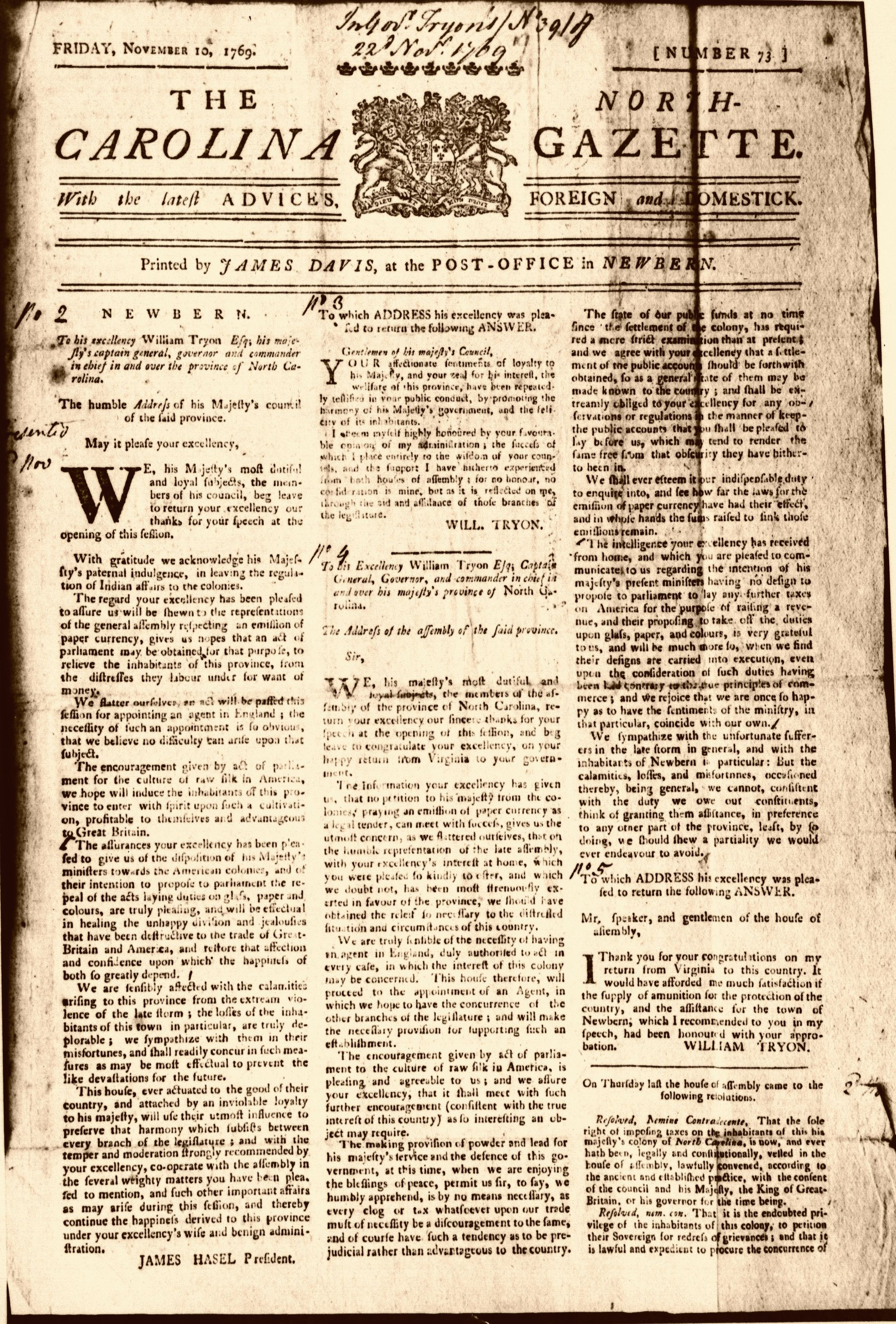
- The North Carolina Gazette, November 10, 1769 issue, printed by James Davis
- Type: Weekly newspaper
- Publisher: James Davis (1751 - c. 1783), Robert Keith (c. 1783 - 1784), Francois Xavier Martin (1786 - 1798)
- Founded: 1751
- Ceased publication: Circa 1759, and revived multiple times through c. 1798
- Headquarters: New Bern, North Carolina

The North Carolina Gazette was the first newspaper published in North Carolina, then the Province of North Carolina. It originally published from 1751 and continued to be published for approximately eight years, during which time it was discontinued and started up again before and during the American Revolutionary War. It was revived as the name of subsequent papers both related and unrelated to original publisher through the end of the 18th century.

== History ==
The Gazette was published by James Davis (1721–1785) in New Bern, North Carolina. Based on the earliest still existing copy, it is believed to have first been published on August 9, 1751, styled as the NO^{th} Carolina Gazette. Davis came from Virginia in 1749 to start a printing press, as the colonial Assembly could not publish laws without a printer. Previously, the lack of a paper for the colony meant residents had to rely on the Virginia Gazette (founded 1736) for news and advertising. It is believed likely that Davis trained under William Parks, who published the Virginia Gazette, but it is not certain.

The Gazette ran mostly international news, and little local news. It was intended to be a weekly but its publication is believed to have been less regular, with occasional gaps in publishing, until the venture folded around 1759, or perhaps until 1761. The end date is not certain, as a very limited number of issues of the newspaper have been preserved. The latest issue that is still extant dates from October 18, 1759.

== Second Gazette ==
After working on publishing a newspaper for four years under another name in the 1760s, The North Carolina Magazine; Or Universal Intelligencer, Davis restarted the North Carolina Gazette on May 27, 1768, restarting at "volume 1". However, the Great Chesapeake Bay Hurricane in September 1769 wrecked his shop and stopped publication for some time. A letter to colonial governor William Tryon about the storm reported the damage: "Mr. Davis’s House [is] a mere Wreck, his printing Office broke to Pieces, his Papers destroyed and Types buried in the Sands." Davis and his family had to forage the beach to recover his type.

Paper shortages, and Davis' son Thomas being drafted into army during the American Revolutionary War caused further stoppages, and the paper ceased publication altogether in 1778.

== Later Gazettes ==
Davis once again revived the Gazette on August 28, 1783, in conjunction with his son Thomas, and Robert Keith of Pennsylvania. It did not last very long, but published for at least a year. Keith took control of the paper as the elder Davis' health failed, and expanded the paper's name to North Carolina Gazette; or Impartial Intellgencer and Weekly General Advertiser.

Francois Xavier Martin published a final iteration of the North Carolina Gazette (or Martin's North Carolina Gazette) which published from about 1786 to 1798.

== See also ==
- Early American publishers and printers
- List of early American publishers and printers
- History of American newspapers
