= SS John Wright Stanly =

World War II Liberty ship of the United States

History

United States
- Name: John Wright Stanly
- Namesake: John Wright Stanly
- Builder: North Carolina Shipbuilding Company, Wilmington, North Carolina
- Yard number: 59
- Way number: 5
- Laid down: 18 December 1942
- Launched: 19 January 1943
- Renamed: Leiv Eriksson
- Fate: Scrapped 1969

General characteristics
- Type: Liberty ship
- Tonnage: 7,000 long tons deadweight (DWT)
- Length: 441 ft 6 in (134.57 m)
- Beam: 56 ft 11 in (17.35 m)
- Draft: 27 ft 9 in (8.46 m)
- Propulsion: Two oil-fired boilers; Triple expansion steam engine; Single screw; 2,500 hp (1,864 kW)
- Speed: 11 knots (20 km/h; 13 mph)
- Capacity: 9,140 tons cargo
- Complement: 41
- Armament: 1 × Stern-mounted 4 in (100 mm) deck gun; AA guns

SS John Wright Stanly (MC contract 881) was a Liberty ship built in the United States during World War II. She was originally named after John Wright Stanly, a New Bern, North Carolina businessman and American Revolutionary War privateer. On the ways she was renamed SS Leiv Eiriksson after the Norse explorer.

The ship was laid down by North Carolina Shipbuilding Company in their Cape Fear River yard on December 18, 1942, then launched on January 19, 1943. She was operated by the Barber Steamship Company from her deliver until August 14, 1944, when American West African Lines took over. In October 1946 the Norwegian government purchased Eriksson. She was sold into private hands in 1947 and scrapped in 1969.
