= Clement Hall =

British-American Anglican missionary and author

Clement Hall (1706–1759) was an Anglican missionary and author of numerous religious works. He emigrated to the British colony of North Carolina where he continued in his religious and spiritual writings. He was the author of the first privately written book printed in the Colony of North Carolina. Hall's son, Clement, fought in the American Revolutionary War.

== Early life and family ==
Clement Hall was born in 1706 in Warwickshire, England. Historians assume that he lived near Coventry where other members of his immediate family lived. On May 29, 1706, Hall was baptized at Saint Mary's Church, in Warwick. He received his basic education in Warwick's public school. In 1731, Hall and his brother Robert emigrated to the Province of North Carolina where they established their residence in Perquimans County, North Carolina. Hall married Frances Foster in the summer of 1742. She was the daughter of Francis Foster who served in the colonial government since 1689. Hall's mother either emigrated with him or arrived soon afterwards. She died in Edenton on February 8, 1752, at age 73, and was interred in the grave yard at Saint Paul's Church. Hall's son, also named Clement, fought in the American Revolutionary War in the Continental Army and later corresponded with George Washington on several occasions.

== Colonial life ==
In 1731 Hall purchased a 104-acre plantation on the northeastern side of Perquimans River. He was appointed a justice of the Perquimans County Court in 1739. Clement Hall's pursued to be seek ordination as a missionary in the Church of England in the summer of 1743. Several reputable men in the colony regarded Hall as a true Christian and his qualities as a missionary and testified to his "Honour, Diligence and Integrity". Hall spent much time riding alone on horseback about the countryside where he came up with ideas for a religious work he authored, entitled, A Collection of Many Christian Experiences, and Several Places of Scripture. His work was printed, by James Davis, which became historically noted as the first non-legal book published in North Carolina. The only known copy of the book is in the Rare Book Collection, Duke University Library, Durham, North Carolina. Clement's work was reprinted at Raleigh, State Department of Archives and History, 1961.

== See also ==
- Early American publishers and printers (contains much history about the printing of religious works in colonial America)

== Bibliography ==
- The North Carolina Historical Review, January - October, 1950. Vol. XXVII. Raleigh : State Department of Archives and History. 1924.
- Hall, Clement. "To George Washington from Clement Hall, 15 January 1790". National Archives: Founders Online.
- Powell, William S., ed. (2000). Dictionary of North Carolina biography. Vol. III. University of North Carolina Press. ISBN 978-0-8078-67013.
- Reavis, Scott Aaron (2000). JAMES DAVIS: NORTH CAROLINA'S FIRST PRINTER (PDF) (Master of Arts). University of North Carolina.
- "Clement Hall".
