= George Peake (clergyman) =

English cricketer and clergyman

George Eden Frederick Peake (6 March 1846 – 24 June 1901) was an English clergyman and cricketer who played first-class cricket for Somerset in 1885. He was born at Taunton, Somerset and died at Newquay, Cornwall.

Peake played amateur cricket for sides in the Somerset area before and after the formation of Somerset County Cricket Club in 1875, and in many of them he was successful as a bowler, though both his bowling and his batting style are unknown. His single first-class match in 1885 in a period when Somerset had some difficulty in raising a team saw him bat at No 10 in both innings of the match against Surrey, and he did not bowl.

By profession, Peake was a Church of England clergyman. He was educated at St Mary's Hall, Oxford and ordained as priest in 1872. He served as a curate in churches at Bishop's Hull, Taunton, at Houghton-le-Spring, County Durham and at Chatham, Kent. His first vicar's post was at Rochester and he moved back to Somerset in 1884 at Eastover, Bridgwater. In 1887 he was appointed rector of Holford, which was a benefice in the gift of Eton College. In 1899 he was vicar of Over Stowey and inspector of schools for the diocese of Bath and Wells, and "accepted the prebendal stall of Wiveliscombe in Wells Cathedral". The following year, he was appointed vicar of Brent Knoll, Somerset.
