= Justice of the peace (North Carolina) =

The justice of the peace was a court official that existed at the county or district level in from the colonial period of the Province of North Carolina until 1968 in the U.S. State of North Carolina. Originally, the Justices of the Peace had authority over the Magistrates Courts, which covered petty criminal offenses and some civil matters. They were appointed by the Governor of the Province. In 1741, they were given the authority to solemnize marriages in counties that did not have ministers or with the consent of the local minister. After North Carolina became a State, they continued authority over Magistrates Courts at the county level, as well as solemnizing of marriages. They were commissioned by Governor of North Carolina upon recommendation of the North Carolina General Assembly. After the U.S. Civil War, they were authorized to register slave marriages that took place before the war. The number of Justices of the Peace in North Carolina continued to grow until the 1950s. The lack of uniform jurisdictions, rules and appointment procedures across North Carolina counties led to major changes in the North Carolina judicial system in 1968 that abolished the Justices of the Peace and placed some of their responsibilities with Magistrates.

== Colonial period ==
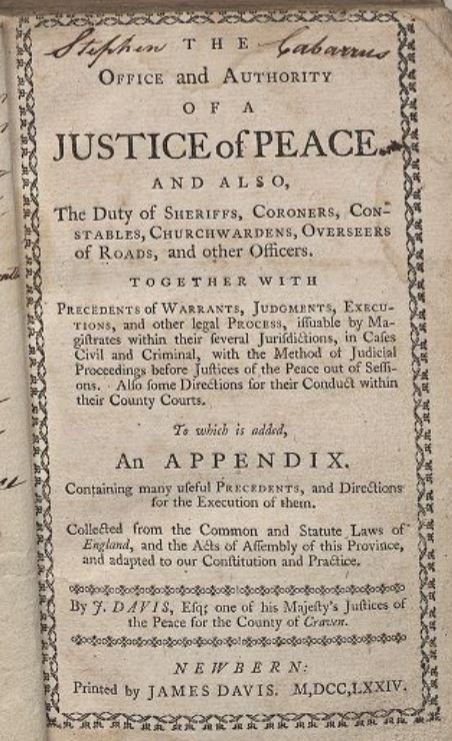
Office and Authority of a Justice of the Peace, by James Davis, 1774, North Carolina

As the Province of North Carolina, counties and districts: were set up by the colonial Governor of North Carolina to serve as local government. In each county or district, the governor appointed Justices of the Peace. These Justices of Peace served as both court and administrator for the county or district. The courts administered by the Justices of the Peace were called Court of Pleas and Quarter Sessions. Their jurisdiction included petty criminal offenses and some civil matters. In 1741, the colonial General Assembly gave authority to Justices of the Peace to solemnize marriages in any counties that had no minister or with a ministers consent.

The following description of duties of the Justices of the Peace was made by Governor William Tryon in 1768 to the North Carolina Governor's Council

"... keep and cause to be kept all Ordinances and Statutes and Acts of Assembly of our said Province for the good of the Peace and Preservation of the same, and for the Quiet Rule and Government of our People in the said Province (as well within Liberties as without) according to the Form and Effect of the same, and to Chastise and Punish all Persons that Offend against the Form of those Ordinances, Liberties and Acts of Assembly, and to cause to come before you or any of you all those who to any one or more of our People concerning their Bodies or the Firing of their Houses have used threats, to find sufficient security for the Peace or their good behaviour towards us and our People, and if they shall refuse to find such Security, then them in our Prisons until they shall find such Security to cause to be safely kept, and also to Cause to come before you or any of you all those who have Committed any Treasons, Felonies, Poysonings, Enchantments, Sorceries, Art Magick Trespasses and Extortions whatsoever within our said Province; And also all those who in our said Province in Companies against our Peace in Disturbance of our People with armed force have gone or rode or who shall hereafter presume to go or ride, and also all those who have there lain in wait, or who shall presume to lay in wait, and them in our Prisons to cause to be safely kept, untill they shall be discharged by due Course of Law, or otherwise dealt with according as by the said Ordinances, Statutes, and Acts Assembly is directed, or shall be directed, and ought to be done."

The first manual for North Carolina justices of the peace was written by James Davisin 1774. This manual was based on a similar manual written in Virginia in 1736. Colonial justices of peace were based on English law. However, there were major differences in that colonial justices of the peace had civil jurisdictions and sat as a court of record in criminal matters. In southern colonies, such as North Carolina, justices of the peace also had responsibilities for matters concerning slaves.

== Early Statehood ==
The 1776 Constitution of North Carolina says the following about the Justices of the Peace: "XXXIII. That the Justices of the Peace, within their respective counties in this State, shall in future be recommended to the Governor for the time being, by the Representatives in General Assembly; and the Governor shall commission them accordingly: and the Justices, when so commissioned, shall hold their offices during good behaviour, and shall not be removed from office by the General Assembly, unless for misbehaviour, absence, or inability." In 1778, a law was passed by the North Carolina legislature that authorized Justices of Peace to solemnize marriages A few years later in 1805, Superior Courts were set up in North Carolina. The county courts continued to be run by the Justices of the Peace.

== After the U.S. Civil War ==
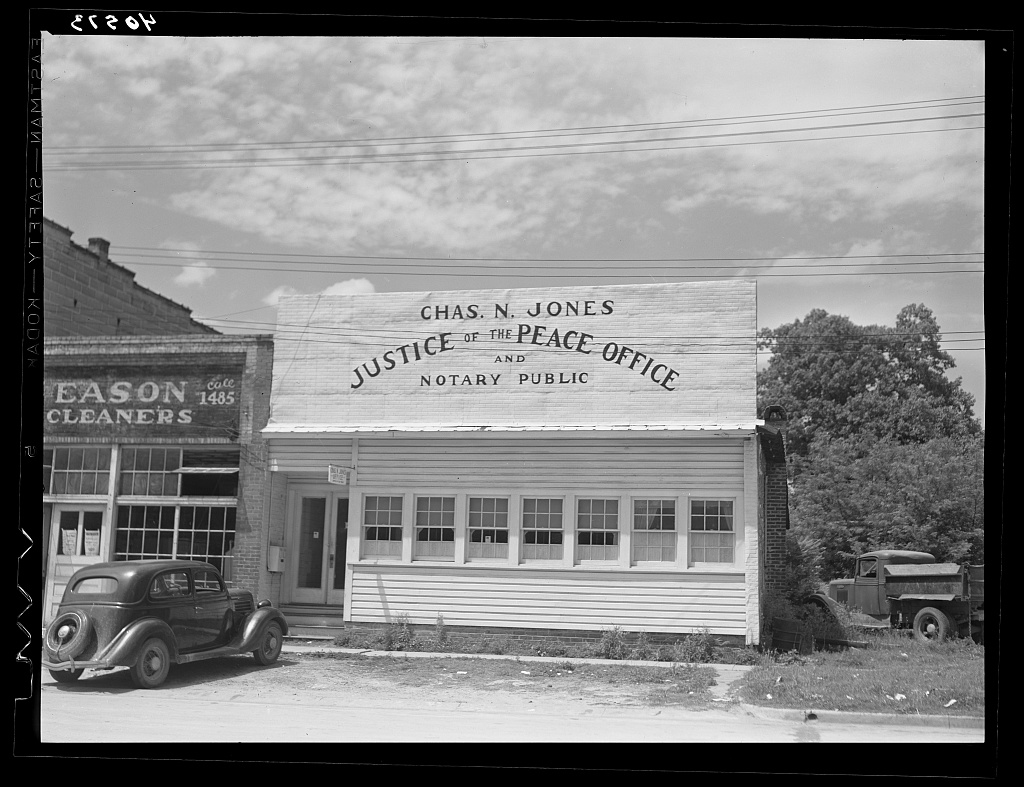
Justice of the Peace in Graham, Alamance County, North Carolina, 1940

In 1866, The General Assembly passed "An Act Concerning Negroes and Persons of Color or of Mixed Blood". This act allowed the Justices of Peace to register slave marriages that had taken place before emancipation.

In 1868, the Court reform Act did away with marriage bonds and authorized the Register of Deeds to register marriages This same act did away with Courts of Please and Quarter Sessions. However, Justices of the Peace remained as a separate judicial officers with limited authorities. For a while they continued to be appointed by the Governor but later appointed by the legislature. In 1868, the Board of County Commissioners replaced Justices of the Peace in their duties as officers of the county government.

In 1877, the Conservative lead North Carolina General Assembly passed a law returning control of the county government to the Justices of the Peace and eliminated elected county commissioners. This lasted until 1905 when the legislature restored popularly elected county commissioners.

== Modern era ==
The number of Justices of the Peace continued to grow until it reached about 900 in the 1950s. The lack of jurisdiction uniformity, rules or selection procedures led to reforms in the 1950s. This led to the replacement of Justices of Peace with magistrates. The Justices of the Peace office was removed as a part of the North Carolina Judiciary system by an act of the North Carolina General Assembly in 1968. Specifically, this act (Chapter 7A, Article 16) included the following statement: "Office of justice of the peace abolished. The office of justice of the peace is abolished in each county upon the establishment of a district court therein. (1965, c. 310, s. 1.)" The North Carolina Constitution, amended in 1971, did not include any mention of "Justice of the Peace". The "Magistrate" replaced Justices of the Peace in their judiciary duties.

== See also ==
- Government of North Carolina
- Justice of the peace

== Additional reading ==
- Botein, Stephen (1983). Early American Law and Society. New York: Knopf.
- Clark, Walter Clark, ed. (1906). The State Records of North Carolina, Vol. XXIII, Vol XXIV, Vol. XXV. Goldsboro.
- Davis, James Davis (1774). The Office and Authority of a Justice of Peace.
- Friedman, Lawrence Meir (1985). A History of American Law. New York: Simon and Schuster.
- Johnson, Guion Griffis (October 1931). Courtship and Marriage Customs in Ante-Bellum North Carolina, The North Carolina Historical Review. Vol. XI.
- Leary, Helen, ed. (1996). Marriage, Divorce, and Vital Records, North Carolina Research. Raleigh.
- Murfree, William L. (1886). Justices of the Peace, a Compendium. F. H. Thomas Law Book Company. p. 603. "north carolina justice of the peace."
- Lewis, J.D. "North Carolina Judicial Branch".
- Potter, Henry (1816). A Guide to Sheriffs, Corners, Clerks, Constables, and other Civil Officers According to the Laws of North Carolina.
- Powell, William S. (2006). Marriage, Encyclopedia of North Carolina. Chapel Hill.
- Public Laws of the State of North Carolina Passed by the General Assembly at the session of 1866. Raleigh. 1866.
- Saunders, William L. Saunders, ed. (1890). The Colonial Records of North Carolina, Vol. II – 1713 to 1738, Vol.VIII – 1769 to 1771. Raleigh.
- White, Baretta McGhee (1995). Somebody Knows My Name: Marriages of Freed People in North Carolina, County by County. Athens.
- General Statutes of North Carolina, Annotated. Vol. 8. Charlottesville. 2003.
