= New Bern, North Carolina =

- City
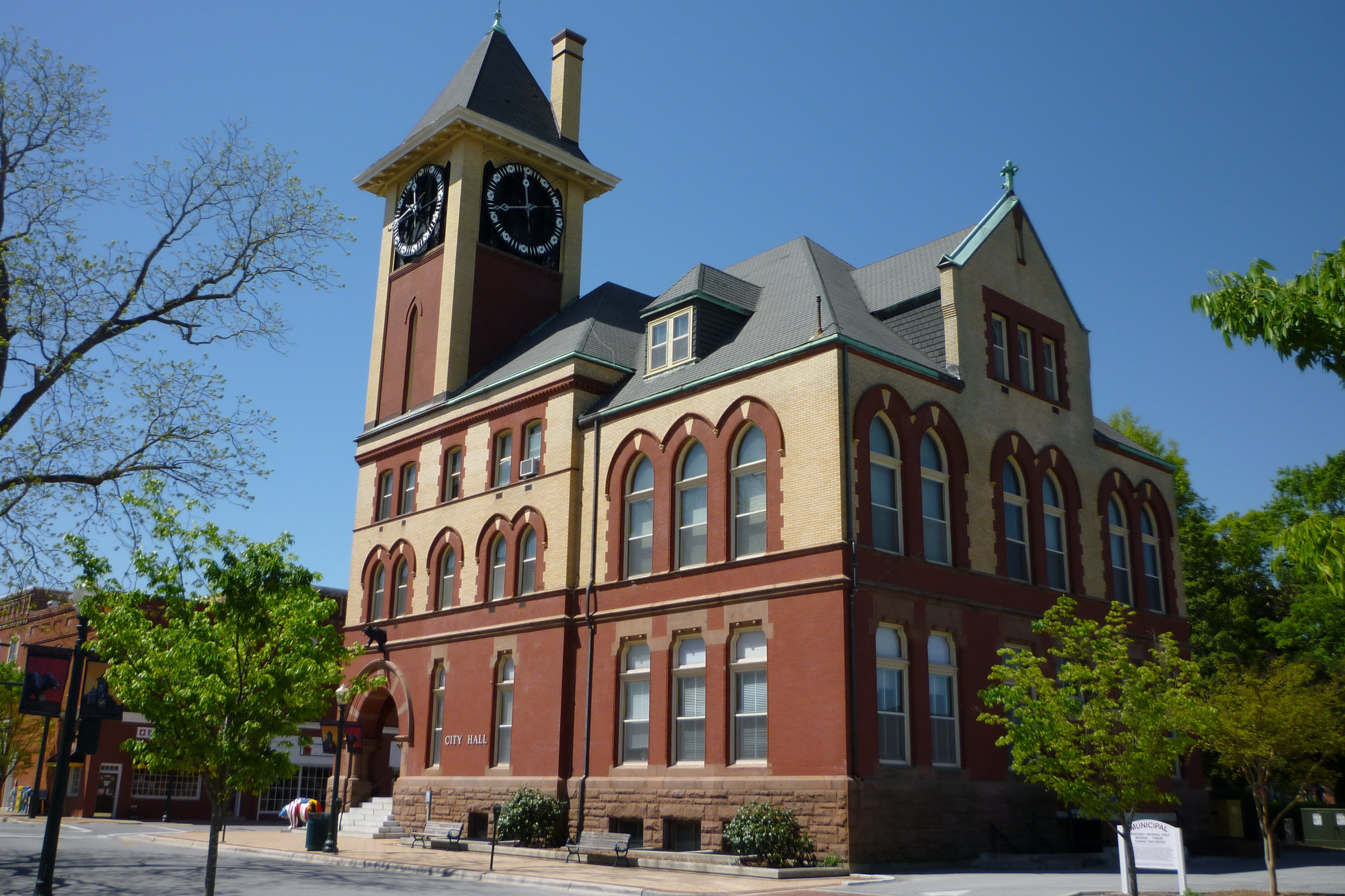
- Main façade of the New Bern City Hall

- Flag Coat of arms
- Nickname: The Birthplace of Pepsi
- Location in North Carolina
- Coordinates: 35°05′45″N 77°04′20″W
- Country: United States
- State: North Carolina
- County: Craven
- Founded: October 1710
- Chartered: November 23, 1723
- Founder: Baron of Bernberg
- Named for: Bern, Switzerland

Government
  - Mayor: Jeffrey T. Odham

Area
  - Total: 29.95 sq mi (77.56 km^{2})
  - Land: 28.46 sq mi (73.70 km^{2})
  - Water: 1.49 sq mi (3.86 km^{2})
- Elevation: 13 ft (4.0 m)

Population (2020)
  - Total: 31,291
  - Density: 1,099.6/sq mi (424.56/km^{2})
- Time zone: UTC-5 (Eastern (EST))
  - Summer (DST): UTC-4 (EDT)
- ZIP codes: 28560, 28562
- Area code: 252
- FIPS code: 37-46340
- GNIS feature ID: 2404358
- Website: newbernnc.gov

New Bern (pronounced /'nu bərn/ NEW-bern), is a city in Craven County, North Carolina, United States, and its county seat. It had a population of 31,291 at the 2020 census. It is located at the confluence of the Neuse and the Trent Rivers, near the headwaters of Pamlico Sound on the North Carolina coast. It lies 112 miles (180 km) east of Raleigh, 89 miles (143 km) north of Wilmington, and 162 miles (261 km) south of Norfolk, Virginia.

New Bern was founded in October 1710 by the Palatines and Swiss under the leadership of Christoph von Graffenried. The new colonists named their settlement after Bern, the Swiss region from which many of the colonists and their patron had emigrated. New Bern is the second-oldest European-settled colonial town in North Carolina, after Bath. It served as the capital of North Carolina from 1770 to 1792. After the American Revolution (1775–1783), New Bern became wealthy and quickly developed a rich cultural life. At one time, New Bern was called "the Athens of the South", renowned for its Masonic Temple and Athens Theater. These are both still very active today.

New Bern has four historic districts listed on the National Register of Historic Places; their numerous contributing buildings include residences, stores, and churches dating back to the early 18th century. Within walking distance of the waterfront are more than 164 homes and buildings listed on the National Register. Also nearby are several bed and breakfasts, hotels, restaurants, banks, antiques stores, and specialty shops. The historic districts contain many of the city's 2,000 crape myrtles—its official flower—and developed gardens. New Bern has two "Local Historic Districts", a municipal zoning overlay that affords legal protection to the exteriors of New Bern's historic structures.

== History ==
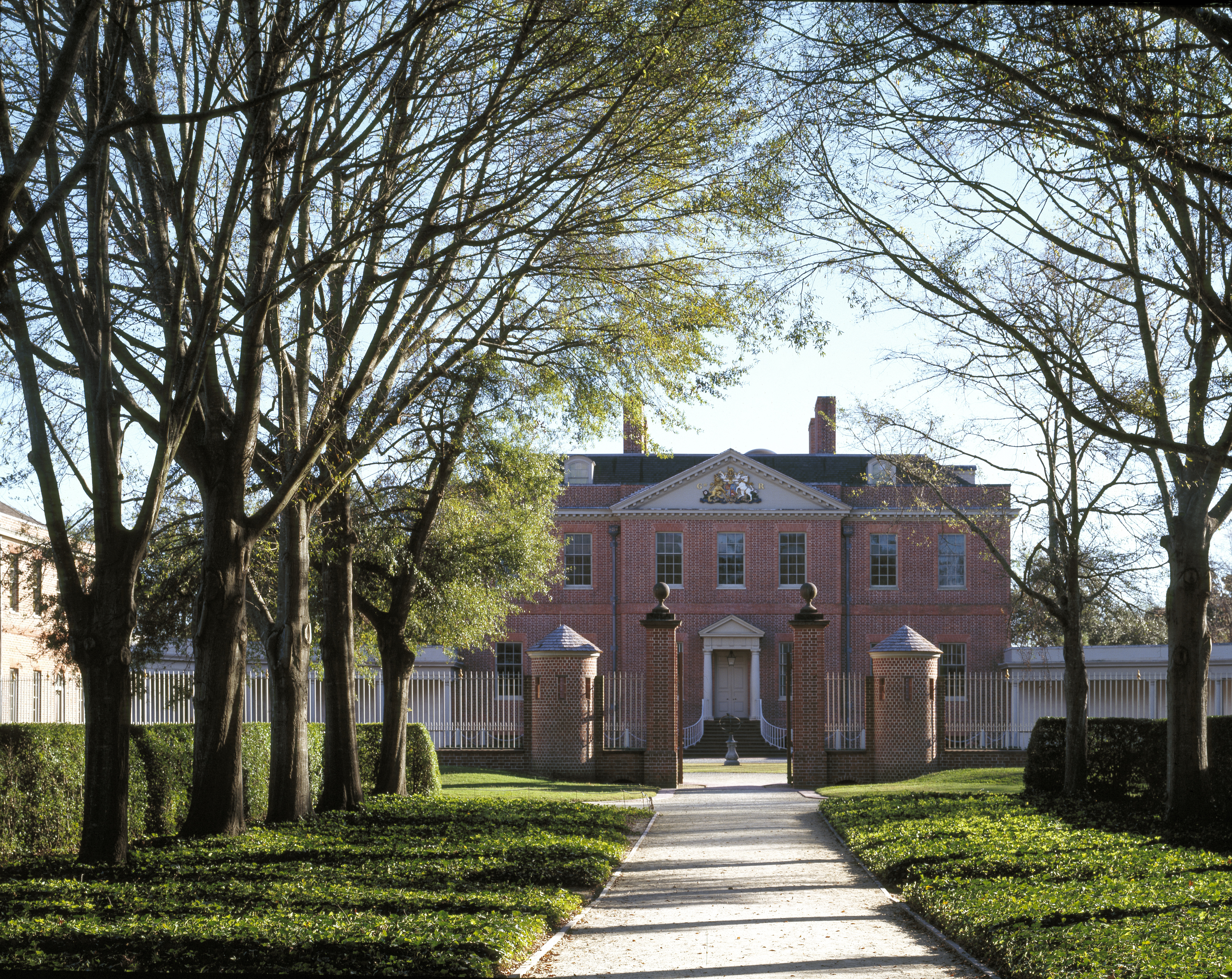
British governor's palace (Tryon Palace), by John Hawks (rebuilt 1959)

New Bern was settled in October 1710 by the Palatines and Swiss under the leadership of Christoph von Graffenried. The new colonists named their settlement after the Canton of Bern, home of their patron. Von Graffenried had the original plat of the town laid out in the shape of a cross, though later development and additional streets have obscured this pattern within the regular street grid. The British governor's palace (present-day Tryon Palace) served as the capitol of North Carolina from 1770 until the state government relocated to Raleigh in 1792, after a fire had destroyed much of the capitol. This became the first permanent capital city of North Carolina.

No printer was available in North Carolina until 1749, when the North Carolina Assembly commissioned James Davis from Williamsburg, Virginia, to act as their official printer. Before this time, the laws and legal journals of North Carolina were handwritten and were largely kept in a disorganized manner, prompting them to hire Davis. Davis settled in New Bern and was appointed by colonial postmaster general Benjamin Franklin as North Carolina's first postmaster, who also became active in North Carolina's politics, as a member of the assembly and later as the sheriff. Davis also founded and printed the North-Carolina Gazette in New Bern, North Carolina's first newspaper.

During the 19th-century Federal period, New Bern became the largest city in North Carolina, developed on the trade of goods and slaves associated with plantation agriculture. After Raleigh was named the state capital in 1792, New Bern rebuilt its economy by expanding on trade via shipping routes to the Caribbean and New England. It was part of the Triangle Trade in sugar, slaves, and desired goods. It reached a population of 3,600 in 1815.

In 1862 during the early stages of the American Civil War, the area was the site of the Battle of New Bern. Federal (Union) forces captured and occupied the town until the end of the war in 1865. Nearly 10,000 enslaved blacks escaped during this period in the region and went to the Union Army camps for protection and freedom. The Union Army set up the Trent River contraband camp at New Bern to house the refugees. It organized the adults for work. Missionaries came to teach literacy to both adults and children.

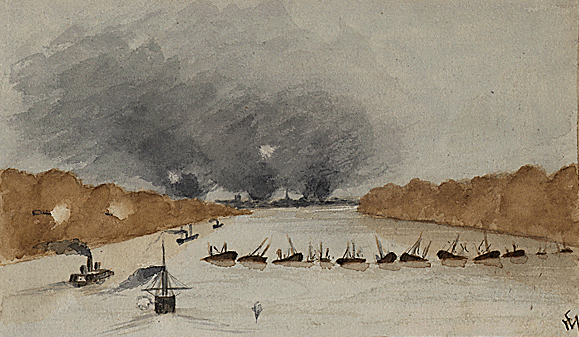
The advance of the Gunboats up the river to New Berne, N. Carolina. Passing the Barricade, 1862

Due to the continuous occupation by the Union Army, New Bern avoided some of the destruction of the war years. Much social disruption occurred because of the occupation and the thousands of freedmen camped near the city. Whereas the 1860 Census had shown a population of 5,432 (of whom 3,072, or 57%, were black), the population had swollen by the end of the war to more than 20,000, mostly because of the influx of freedmen. Still, New Bern recovered more quickly than many cities after the war. By the 1870s, the lumber industry was developing as the chief part of New Bern's economy. Timber harvested could be sent down the two nearby rivers. The city continued to be a center for freedmen, who created communities independent of white supervision, thriving churches, fraternal associations, and their own businesses. By 1877, the city had a majority-black population.

The state legislature defined the city and county as part of North Carolina's 2nd congressional district, which as former plantation territory, held a concentration of the state's black residents. They elected four blacks to the US Congress in the late 19th century. The state's passage of a constitutional suffrage amendment in 1900 used various devices to disenfranchise black citizens. As a result, they were totally closed out of the political process, including participation on juries and in local offices; white Democrats maintained this suppression mostly, until after passage of federal civil-rights legislation, including the Voting Rights Act of 1965, which provided for federal enforcement of constitutional rights.

By 1890, New Bern had become the largest lumber center in North Carolina and one of the largest in all of the South. During this time, as many as 16 lumber mills were running and employing hundreds of men from New Bern and the area. The competitive nature of the lumber barons and the abundance of lumber and craftsmen led to the construction in New Bern of some of the finest homes in the South, many of which have survived. The lumber boom lasted until the 1920s. One-by-one, the lumber mills went out of business. The last of these, owned by Weyerhaeuser, operated a lumber mill in Vanceboro, near New Bern, until it indefinitely curtailed operations in 2024.

The city has four National Historic Districts and two local ones, which have helped preserve the character of the architecture. The Downtown Local Historic District is 368.64 acres (149.18 ha) or 0.576 square miles (1.49 km^{2}); the Riverside Local Historic District covers 51.94 acres (21.02 ha) or 0.081 square miles (0.21 km^{2}). Union Point Park borders the Neuse and Trent rivers.

== Hurricanes ==
New Bern's location near the Atlantic Coast renders it subject to the effects of Atlantic hurricane seasons. For example, in the 18th century, the town suffered severe damage in the Great Chesapeake Bay Hurricane of 1769. Other hurricanes, such as Hurricane Ione in 1955 and Hurricane Floyd in 1999, have also caused significant flooding and damage.

In September 2018, Hurricane Florence made landfall in the United States just south of Wrightsville Beach, 88.4 miles southwest of New Bern. A storm surge of up to 13.5 feet, in addition to days of heavy rains, severely flooded various parts of the town.

== Geography ==
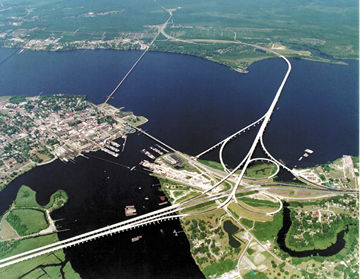
Aerial view of New Bern (center left) showing the confluence of Trent (bottom center) and Neuse (left to right) Rivers

New Bern is located at the confluence of the Trent and Neuse Rivers, two tidal waterways, in North Carolina's Inner Banks region.

According to the United States Census Bureau, the city has a total area of 29.7 square miles (76.9 km^{2}), of which 1.4 square miles (3.7 km^{2}), or 4.87%, is covered by water.

U.S. routes 17 and 70 pass through the city, merging briefly as a four-lane expressway passing south of the city center. US 70 leads west 33 miles (53 km) to Kinston and southeast 35 miles (56 km) to Morehead City near the Atlantic Ocean. Raleigh, the state capital, is 112 miles (180 km) west via US 70. US 17 leads southwest 37 miles (60 km) to Jacksonville, and crosses the Neuse River on a new bridge to lead north 36 miles (58 km) to Washington.

=== Climate ===
New Bern experiences a humid subtropical climate typical of the Atlantic coastal plain. Summers are hot and humid, with frequent afternoon thunderstorms that account for much of the higher summer precipitation. Spring and fall are generally mild, with fall foliage occurring from late October to early November. Winters are relatively mild and drier than the remainder of the year, with infrequent snowfall.

Climate data for New Bern, North Carolina (Coastal Carolina Regional Airport), 1991–2020 normals, extremes 1933–present
Month	Jan	Feb	Mar	Apr	May	Jun	Jul	Aug	Sep	Oct	Nov	Dec	Year
Record high °F (°C)	82 (28)	88 (31)	92 (33)	95 (35)	100 (38)	105 (41)	106 (41)	103 (39)	101 (38)	97 (36)	87 (31)	83 (28)	106 (41)
Mean maximum °F (°C)	75.1 (23.9)	77.0 (25.0)	82.5 (28.1)	87.3 (30.7)	92.0 (33.3)	95.8 (35.4)	96.7 (35.9)	95.8 (35.4)	91.8 (33.2)	86.9 (30.5)	80.6 (27.0)	75.6 (24.2)	97.8 (36.6)
Mean daily maximum °F (°C)	55.1 (12.8)	58.5 (14.7)	64.9 (18.3)	73.6 (23.1)	80.4 (26.9)	86.7 (30.4)	89.6 (32.0)	87.9 (31.1)	83.1 (28.4)	74.9 (23.8)	65.6 (18.7)	58.5 (14.7)	73.2 (22.9)
Daily mean °F (°C)	44.5 (6.9)	47.1 (8.4)	53.2 (11.8)	61.8 (16.6)	69.5 (20.8)	77.0 (25.0)	80.4 (26.9)	78.9 (26.1)	74.2 (23.4)	64.2 (17.9)	54.2 (12.3)	47.7 (8.7)	62.7 (17.1)
Mean daily minimum °F (°C)	33.8 (1.0)	35.8 (2.1)	41.5 (5.3)	49.9 (9.9)	58.7 (14.8)	67.2 (19.6)	71.2 (21.8)	70.0 (21.1)	65.2 (18.4)	53.5 (11.9)	42.8 (6.0)	36.9 (2.7)	52.2 (11.2)
Mean minimum °F (°C)	17.6 (−8.0)	21.5 (−5.8)	25.9 (−3.4)	35.2 (1.8)	46.1 (7.8)	56.5 (13.6)	63.6 (17.6)	62.8 (17.1)	54.4 (12.4)	38.0 (3.3)	27.7 (−2.4)	22.5 (−5.3)	16.1 (−8.8)
Record low °F (°C)	1 (−17)	6 (−14)	16 (−9)	29 (−2)	32 (0)	44 (7)	55 (13)	50 (10)	43 (6)	26 (−3)	17 (−8)	−4 (−20)	−4 (−20)
Average precipitation inches (mm)	3.89 (99)	3.32 (84)	3.85 (98)	3.18 (81)	4.25 (108)	4.60 (117)	6.26 (159)	6.81 (173)	6.33 (161)	3.56 (90)	3.33 (85)	3.63 (92)	53.01 (1,346)
Average snowfall inches (cm)	0.3 (0.76)	0.3 (0.76)	0.0 (0.0)	0.1 (0.25)	0.0 (0.0)	0.0 (0.0)	0.0 (0.0)	0.0 (0.0)	0.0 (0.0)	0.0 (0.0)	0.0 (0.0)	0.9 (2.3)	1.5 (3.8)
Average precipitation days (≥ 0.01 in)	10.2	9.6	10.0	8.9	10.6	11.5	13.6	13.6	11.1	8.8	8.3	10.8	127.0
Average snowy days (≥ 0.1 in)	0.1	0.1	0.0	0.1	0.0	0.0	0.0	0.0	0.0	0.0	0.0	0.2	0.5
Source: NOAA (snow 1981–2010)

== Demographics ==
Historical population
Census	Pop.	Note	%±
1800	2,467		—
1820	3,663		—
1830	3,796		3.6%
1840	3,690		−2.8%
1850	4,681		26.9%
1860	5,432		16.0%
1870	5,849		7.7%
1880	6,443		10.2%
1890	7,843		21.7%
1900	9,090		15.9%
1910	9,961		9.6%
1920	12,198		22.5%
1930	11,981		−1.8%
1940	11,815		−1.4%
1950	15,812		33.8%
1960	15,717		−0.6%
1970	14,660		−6.7%
1980	14,557		−0.7%
1990	17,363		19.3%
2000	23,128		33.2%
2010	29,524		27.7%
2020	31,291		6.0%
U.S. Decennial Census

=== 2020 census ===
As of the 2020 census, New Bern had a population of 31,291. The median age was 42.8 years. 20.8% of residents were under the age of 18 and 24.0% of residents were 65 years of age or older. For every 100 females there were 86.8 males, and for every 100 females age 18 and over there were 82.7 males age 18 and over.

There were 13,798 households in New Bern, including 8,070 families. Of all households, 25.0% had children under the age of 18 living in them. 40.1% were married-couple households, 18.4% were households with a male householder and no spouse or partner present, and 36.0% were households with a female householder and no spouse or partner present. About 35.1% of all households were made up of individuals and 17.0% had someone living alone who was 65 years of age or older.

Around 2,000 refugees from Myanmar have been resettled in New Bern.

95.1% of residents lived in urban areas, while 4.9% lived in rural areas.

There were 15,655 housing units, of which 11.9% were vacant. The homeowner vacancy rate was 2.7% and the rental vacancy rate was 9.5%.

Racial composition as of the 2020 census
Race	Number	Percent
White	17,744	56.7%
Black or African American	8,414	26.9%
American Indian and Alaska Native	106	0.3%
Asian	2,044	6.5%
Native Hawaiian and Other Pacific Islander	25	0.1%
Some other race	997	3.2%
Two or more races	1,961	6.3%
Hispanic or Latino (of any race)	2,102	6.7%

=== 2015 estimates ===
The median income for a household in the city in 2015 was $41,285.

=== 2010 census ===
The City of New Bern 2010 Census information shows the population of the area was approximately 29,524 people. From 2000 to 2010, the New Bern city population growth percentage was 27.7% (or from 23,128 people to 29,524 people). 22.8% of the New Bern city residents were under 18 years of age. Census 2010 race data for New Bern city include the racial breakdown percentages of 57.0 white, 32.8% black, 3.6% Asian, 5.8% Hispanic and less than 1% Native American, Also, there were 14,471 housing units in the City of New Bern, 88.2% of which were occupied housing units.

== Arts and culture ==
New Bern has several sites listed on the National Register of Historic Places.

== Education ==
=== Colleges ===
- Craven Community College
- University of Mount Olive at New Bern

=== High schools ===
- New Bern High School
- Craven Early College High School

=== Middle schools ===
- Grover C. Fields Middle School
- H.J. McDonald Middle School
- West Craven Middle School

=== Elementary schools ===
- Trent Park Elementary School
- Oaks Road Elementary School
- J.T. Barber Elementary School
- Brinson Memorial Elementary School
- Ben D. Quinn Elementary School
- Albert H. Bangert Elementary School
- Creekside Elementary School
- Bridgeton Elementary School

=== Private schools ===
- Calvary Baptist Christian School
- St. Paul Catholic School (St. Paul Education Center)
- The Epiphany School of Global Studies
- New Bern Christian Academy

== Media ==
=== Radio stations ===
- 1450 AM / 104.3 FM WNOS – News/Talk/Sports
- 1490 AM / 103.9 FM WWNB - ESPN Radio – sports talk
- 88.5 FM WZNB - Public Radio East – Classical Music
- 89.3 FM WTEB - Public Radio East – NPR/News/Talk
- 89.9 FM W210BS - Classical WCPE
- 92.7 FM WBNK - K-Love - Christian Contemporary
- 91.9 FM WAAE - American Family Radio – Religious
- 93.3 FM WERO - Bob 93.3 - Top 40
- 94.1 FM WNBU - Talk
- 95.1 FM WRNS - Country
- 95.7 FM W239BC - R&B Oldies
- 97.5 FM WLGT - The Bridge – Contemporary Christian
- 97.9 FM WNBB – Classic Country
- 99.5 FM WMJV – 99.5/97.5 The Wave – Hot Adult Contemporary
- 101.9 FM WIKS - Kiss FM – Hip Hop & R&B
- 103.3 FM WMGV - V103.3 - Soft AC
- 104.5 FM WSTK - Variety
- 105.1 FM WBKZ - Air 1 - Christian Contemporary
- 105.5 FM WXQR – Pure Rock
- 107.9 FM WNCT – Classic Hits
- 106.5 FM WSFL – Classic Rock
- 107.1 FM WTKF-FM – The Talk Station

== Newspapers ==
- New Bern Sun Journal
- New Bern Live

== Infrastructure ==
=== Transportation ===
Coastal Carolina Regional Airport is a public airport located 3 miles (5 km) south of the central business district of New Bern. The airport offers connecting flights to Charlotte and, via Breeze Airways, flights to Hartford, Connecticut and Orlando, Florida daily.

The New Bern Transport Corporation, a business entity owned by PepsiCo to manage its fleet of delivery trucks and other motor vehicles, is located in White Plains, New York, but was named after the town where Pepsi-Cola was first developed.

The north–south U.S. Route 17 and the east–west U.S. Route 70 pass through New Bern.

As late as 1950, the Atlantic and East Carolina Railway offered passenger train service through New Bern to Morehead City to the east, by the Atlantic coast and to Goldsboro Union Station, where timed connections could be made with the Southern Railway's trains to central and western North Carolina. Service was terminated by the end of 1951.

== Notable people ==
- Charles Laban Abernethy (1872–1955), US Congressman from North Carolina between 1922 and 1935
- Lewis Addison Armistead (1817–1863), Confederate States Army general
- John Eric Armstrong (born 1973), serial killer who killed at least 5 prostitutes in Detroit, Michigan; Born in New Bern
- Shawn Armstrong (born 1990), MLB pitcher
- George Edmund Badger (1795–1866), US Senator from 1846 to 1855
- Bessie Banks (born 1938), singer, first to record the song "Go Now"
- Graham Arthur Barden (1896–1967), 13-term US congressman from 1935 to 1961
- Cullen A. Battle (1829–1905), postbellum mayor of New Bern
- Samuel J. Battle (1883–1966), first African-American policeman in New York City
- Walt Bellamy (1939–2013), NBA Hall of Fame basketball player
- Sarah Boone (1832–1904), inventor
- Bill Bunting (born 1947), NBA Basketball player
- Christoph von Graffenried, 1st Baron of Bernberg (1661–1743), British peer from the Canton of Bern, who founded New Bern in 1710
- Caleb Bradham (1867–1934), pharmacist, best known as inventor of Pepsi
- John Heritage Bryan (1798–1870), US congressman from 1825 to 1829
- Chase Crawford (born 1996), actor and producer
- James Davis (1721–1785) First postmaster and first printer of North Carolina. Founder of the North-Carolina Gazette, North Carolina's first newspaper.
- Gary Downs (born 1972), NFL player for the New York Giants, Atlanta Falcons, Denver Broncos
- Davon Drew (born 1985), NFL tight end
- Elwood Edwards (1949–2024), voice of AOL's "You've got mail"
- Mary McKinley Daves Ellis (1835–1916), First Lady of North Carolina
- William Gaston (1778–1834), jurist and US congressman from 1813 to 1817
- John Patterson Green (1845–1940) attorney, the first African American state senator in Ohio.
- Montario Hardesty (born 1987), NFL running back for Cleveland Browns
- Nathan Healy (born 1990), professional basketball player
- William J. Hutchins (1813–1884), mercantilist, railroad owner, and Mayor of Houston from 1861 to 1862
- Donna Hutchinson (born 1949), former member of Arkansas House of Representatives, born in New Bern
- Jumpin Jackie Jackson (1940–2019), Harlem Globetrotter basketball player
- George Koonce (born 1968), NFL player for Green Bay Packers and Seattle Seahawks; athletic director of University of Wisconsin–Milwaukee
- Peter Loftin (1958–2019), entrepreneur
- Bob Mann (1924–2006), NFL player; first African American to play for Detroit Lions and later Green Bay Packers
- Aaron Martin (born 1941), former NFL player for Los Angeles Rams, Philadelphia Eagles, and Washington Redskins
- Donum Montford (1771–1838), brickmason
- Eliza Jane McKissack (1828–1900), director and founding member of Conservatory of Music at University of North Texas
- Linda McMahon (born 1948), 25th administrator of the Small Business Administration, former CEO of World Wrestling Entertainment and United States Secretary of Education
- David B. Mintz (fl. 1805–1806), Methodist minister and circuit rider
- Michael R. Morgan (born 1955), African American justice of the Supreme Court of North Carolina
- Rob Morgan (born 1973) actor
- Dan Neil (born 1960), Pulitzer Prize-winning automotive journalist
- Bob Perry (1934–2017), MLB outfielder
- James E.C. Perry (born 1944), justice of Supreme Court of Florida
- Henry Lee Scott (1814–1886), U.S. Army colonel and son-in-law of Winfield Scott
- Chandler Seagle (born 1996), MLB catcher
- Teddy Shapou (1919–1985), Flying Tiger during World War II
- Brian Simmons (born 1975), NFL player for Cincinnati Bengals and New Orleans Saints
- Furnifold Simmons (1854–1940), former U.S. senator
- William Henry Singleton (1843–1938), former slave who became noted American Civil War soldier
- Nicholas Sparks (born 1965), best-selling author of romance novels and films
- Richard Dobbs Spaight (1758–1802), 8th Governor of North Carolina from 1792 to 1795, and US congressman for the 10th District from 1798 to 1801
- Sara Stanley (1837–1918) Abolitionist, educator
- Edward Stanly (1810–1872), son of John Stanly, congressman 1837–1843, appointed military governor of North Carolina in 1862
- Fabius Maximus Stanly (1815–1882), rear admiral of U.S. Navy, namesake of WWII destroyer USS Stanly (DD-478)
- John Stanly (1774–1834), father of Edward Stanly, US congressman (1801–1803 and 1809–1811)
- Sean Strickland (born 1991), MMA fighter, currently competing in the middleweight division of the UFC as of August 2021
- Adam Warren (born 1987), MLB pitcher
- George Henry White (1852–1918), attorney, banker, last of four African-American US congressmen from North Carolina in the 19th century; next was not elected until 1992
- Kevin Meade Williamson (born 1966), screenwriter, involved with Scream, I Know What You Did Last Summer, and television series Dawson's Creek
- Bayard Wootten (1875–1959), photographer and suffragette

== In popular culture ==
- Jules Verne's 1896 novel Face au Drapeau (Facing the Flag) featured New Bern as the place where one of that story's main characters is committed to an asylum by the U.S. government.
- Nicholas Sparks set a few of his novels (The Notebook, A Bend in the Road, The Wedding, and The Return) in the city.
- In Diana Gabaldon's "Outlander" books, the main characters settle in North Carolina prior to the American Revolutionary War. The novels feature numerous trips to, through, and around colonial New Bern.
