= John Stanley =

John Stanley may refer to:

== Arts and entertainment ==
- John Stanley (cartoonist) (1914–1993), American comic book writer and artist best known for Little Lulu
- John Stanley (composer) (1712–1786), English composer and organist
- John Stanley (playwright) (born 1966), British playwright and screenwriter
- John Stanley (radio broadcaster), Australian radio presenter
- John Mix Stanley (1814–1872), American artist-explorer

== Politics and government ==
- Sir John Stanley (KG) (c. 1350–1414), Lord Lieutenant of Ireland and King of Mann
- Sir John Stanley (died 1437) (c. 1386–1437), his son, King of Mann, MP for Lancashire
- Sir John Stanley, 1st Baronet (1663–1744), Chief Secretary for Ireland and Member of Parliament (MP) for Gorey
- Sir John Thomas Stanley, 6th Baronet (1735–1807), British landowner and amateur scientist
- John Stanley (Hastings MP) (1740–1799), British MP for Hastings
- John Stanley, 1st Baron Stanley of Alderley (1766–1850), British peer and politician
- Sir John Stanley (judge) (1846–1931), Chief Justice of North Western Provinces, British India
- John Stanley, 18th Earl of Derby (1918–1994), British peer, landowner and businessman
- Sir John Stanley (Tonbridge and Malling MP) (1942–2025), British politician

== Other ==
- Neck Stanley (John Wayman Stanley, 1905–1959), American baseball player
