= Great Chesapeake Bay Hurricane of 1769 =

Major weather event in North America

Unknown-strength storm
- 1-minute sustained (SSHWS/NWS)
- Highest winds: [data missing]

Overall effects
- Damage: [data missing]
- Areas affected: North Carolina, Virginia, Maryland, Delaware, New Jersey
- Part of the 1769 Atlantic hurricane season

The Great Chesapeake Bay Hurricane of 1769 was a major hurricane that affected the Atlantic coast of North America from North Carolina to New England on September 7–8, 1769. Considered one of the worst storms of the 18th century, the hurricane likely made landfall near Brunswick Town, North Carolina, before moving northeast through the mid-Atlantic region. The hurricane caused widespread damage in North Carolina and Virginia. In New Bern, tides rose 12 feet (3.7 m) above normal, with losses estimated at £40,000–£50,000. Buildings were destroyed across southeastern Virginia, including around Williamsburg and Norfolk, before the storm continued northeast toward New England.

== Meteorological history ==
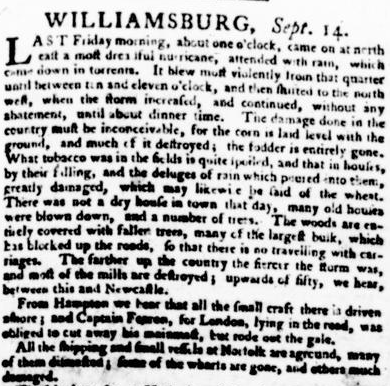
Excerpt of report on the hurricane in The Virginia Gazette (September 14, 1769)

The storm likely made landfall near Brunswick Town in the southern part of North Carolina, where it destroyed the courthouse. The storm caused significant damage in New Bern, North Carolina as tides rose 12 feet above normal. Governor William Tryon of North Carolina speculated that a "a blazing Planet or star" that passed through the sky in August may have been the cause of the storm. Though not the cause, of course, this may have been the Great Comet of 1769.

=== Impact ===
The damage in New Bern was significant and generated a number of reports detailing the value of lost goods. A report in the Pennsylvania Gazette estimated New Bern's losses at 40–50,000 pounds. Buildings that were destroyed included the destruction of the printing office of the North-Carolina Gazette, where the paper's type was buried in sand and had to be dug up. The September 14 issue of The Virginia Gazette ran an early account of the storm which was republished in other colonies.

The eye of the hurricane passed close to Williamsburg, Virginia. Many old houses in eastern North Carolina and southeastern Virginia were destroyed, particularly around Williamsburg, York, Hampton, and Norfolk due to 13 hours of high winds from the northeast to northwest. It caused widespread damage to the Stratford Hall plantation which belonged to the family of the Confederate General Robert E. Lee.

The storm continued northeast along the Atlantic coast, gaining speed as it reached New England and Canada. At Harvard, John Winthrop measured the barometer at 29.57" at 10:15pm on September 8, which suggests that the storm traveled from just east of Williamsburg to Boston in 12 hours, at an average speed of about 40 mph.

In Maryland, writer David Healey has suggested that this hurricane was largely responsible for silting in the port at Charlestown, Maryland, which helped its competitor Baltimore become the premier regional port in the area.

== Storm title ==
The title "Great Chesapeake Bay Hurricane of 1769" is only one name for the storm, and one of recent origin. Modern tropical cyclone naming schemes were not institituted until later. Historian and meteorologist David M. Ludlum discusses the storm twice in his 1963 work Early American Hurricanes 1492-1970. In the section addressing 18th century storms from Hatteras to the north, he refers to "The September Hurricane of 1769"; in the section discussing more southernly storms he titles the entry "The Eastern Carolina Hurricane of September 1769," but it is plain he is addressing the same storm in his treatment and only detailing the effects in different regions.
