= George Peake (inventor) =

American inventor

George Peake (c. 1722 – September 9 1827) was an African American inventor who invented a hand mill for grinding grain.

== Life ==
Peake was born in Maryland in about 1722, lived in Pennsylvania, and later, in 1809, settled in the area that became Cleveland, Ohio. Peake bought a farm on the settlement's outskirts. He may have been the city's first African American resident. He reportedly fought with the British in the French and Indian War before deserting.

Peake married a woman from Maryland and had four sons, two of whom came with him to Cleveland and two more that followed later. Joseph Peake, a notable Cleveland farmer, was his son.

== Inventions ==
Peake invented a hand mill for grinding grain and corn. His mill was found to be easier to use than a mortar and pestle.
