= John Carruthers Stanly =

American slave owner (1774–1845)

John Carruthers Stanly (1774–1845) was one of the largest slave owners in North Carolina and the wealthiest free black resident.

== Life and career ==
Stanly was the illegitimate son of privateer John Wright Stanly and half-brother to U.S. Congressman John Stanly. He became known as one of the largest slave owners in North Carolina and the wealthiest free black resident. Even though he himself was born a slave, Stanly had used his intelligence and family ties to become a successful entrepreneur, land developer, and plantation owner. In fact, Stanly "became not only the largest slave owner in Craven County, and one of the largest in North Carolina, but he owned more than twice as many slaves as the second largest free Negro slave owner in the South." He was a key member of this prominent mixed-race family in New Bern, North Carolina which included his granddaughter, Sara G. Stanley, who would eventually become one of the first African-American women to attend Oberlin College in Ohio, and John Patterson Green, his great-nephew, who is known as the "Father of Labor Day".

== Personal life ==
John C. Stanly's father, John Wright Stanly, was a renowned gambler, counterfeiter, and eventually a licensed privateer who made his riches during the American Revolutionary War by stealing property from the English. John C. Stanly's mother was an Ebo slave, who was born off the West Coast of Africa, in the region of Nigeria, and brought to America on a ship owned by John Wright Stanly. Because of the status of his African-American mother, Stanly was born a slave. However, unlike many other children born under similar circumstances, his father acknowledged him as a relation in their community of New Bern.

Upon his father's death, Stanly inherited some money, but not his freedom. His ownership at some point was transferred over to his father's neighbor and business partner, Alexander Stewart, who captained the ship that brought Stanly's mother from Africa, and his wife Lydia. It is often incorrectly claimed that he was manumitted by the General Assembly of North Carolina in 1808. However, he was actually manumitted thirteen years earlier at age 21 in 1795 by his owners and, by then, adopted by the Stewart family. The controversy is probably the result of Stanly's dissatisfaction at simply being freed and wishing to be declared free, which was a different legal status. During this era, the freedom of black people was constantly changing and ambiguous. To establish legal clarity to protect his growing family wealth, Stanly petitioned the General Assembly multiple times to confirm him and his sons' "emancipated and set freed" with "all the rights and privileges of free persons of mixed blood".

Stanly used the state's court system many times. He resolved disputes, served as an estate's trustee multiple times, and registered many written agreements with white people with the court. He was known as someone who would stand his ground and fought to maintain ownership over his family's property and had a reputation for fairness.

Over the course of his life, he formed close relationships with a few notable prominent white community members, including Lydia Stewart and the lawyer-politician John H. Bryan; but most notable was his relationship with his half-brother, John Stanly Jr. Born the same year as John C., both brothers appear to have maintained an unusually long-lasting close personal and business relationship over many years.

== Business life ==
One of the few business opportunities for freed slaves was becoming a barber. Before he was released from their care, the Stewarts made sure Stanly was educated and trained as a barber so he could support himself. Historian Loren Schweninger, who wrote an extensive article about Stanly's career, described when Stanly was hired out as an apprentice barber, he was considered "intelligent, quick-minded, and hardworking." After he received his freedom and small inheritance, Stanly opened his own barber shop that catered to the wealthy white business people and politicians who were friends of his well-known family. He was popularly known as "Barber Jack". Stephen F. Miller, a local lawyer, described Stanly at the time as "a man of dignified presence" of whom "no citizen of Newbern would hesitate to walk the streets with him." Although Stanly's barbershop was very successful, providing haircuts were not that profitable. Stanly began amassing his wealth primarily by "discounting bank notes"; basically he loaned money to white people who, for a variety of reasons, did not want the stigma of getting a loan from a bank.

New Bern was an important trading center receiving ships filled with raw goods from the Caribbean and manufactured items from New England, Europe, and Africa. Because of its prime location and his unique cultural circumstances, Stanly was able to weather the economic ups and downs in the post-American Revolutionary Era, including a severe outbreak of yellow fever in the 1790s.

Owning the only barbering facilities in town eventually allowed Stanly to hire two slave apprentices, known as Brister and Boston, to run his shop while he began to occupy his time buying parcels of real estate both in town and in the rural surrounding communities around 1798. His first purchase of property was from William Berry, a white man, for only thirty shillings. However, over the next several years, he paid an increasing amount for properties that soon ran from the hundreds to the thousands of dollars. Schweninger noted that Stanly attended auctions to buy land that was confiscated by the county because of back taxes which were owed. By his early thirties, he had a reputation for being a sharp businessman with "significant property holdings". He not only bought property, but when he saw he could make a profit, he would sell it.

Stanly used his revenues to purchase freedom for family members and free others close to him, including his wife and five children. He also rented houses, had income from cotton sales, and attended chattel sales like his white neighbors to purchase slaves. According to Schweninger, state records report that Stanly owned 127 slaves by 1820. These people did a myriad amount of work including working at his barber shop and on his two plantations on Bachelor's Creek along the Neuse River. He loaned out the labor of his slaves for a profit in addition to making money manufacturing and exporting turpentine. Stanly spent a considerable amount of time and money buying and then freeing family members, for example his brother-in-law John Merrick and several slaves owned by familiar white families like the Stewarts. He also took dozens of underage slaves under his guardianship, providing them with jobs and places to live; however, Schweninger was clear to state that "Stanly rose to a position of wealth and prestige through his ownership and use of slave laborers." On one of his properties, Hope Plantation, Stanly hired three white overseers. She also notes that "Stanly differed little from his white neighbors" in his treatment of his slaves. His male slaves were worth twice that of his female slaves, so maintaining families would have been difficult, and Schweninger's research determined that Stanly was not averse to selling his slaves' family members.

By the 1850s, Stanly had amassed property worth approximately $21,200 which "would have placed him in the top one half of one percent among white men" in the South and the nation. Schweninger believed part of his ascendancy was in no small part to his "amicable and close relations with Craven County white [people]." (184) After the Denmark Vessey slave uprising scandal in 1822, southern legislatures enacted new restrictions and controls on slaves and freed blacks. However, Stanly's wealth and family connections isolated him from many of these changes. Schweninger also explained that when Stanly "felt he [was] being treated unfairly, Stanly was not [averse] to using the court system to defend his rights as a property owner."

=== Family life ===
One of the first people Stanly bought out of slavery was his wife Kitty, who was a member of the Green family, another prominent mixed-race family in New Bern born into slavery. According to North Carolina marriage records, John legally married Kitty Green on March 26, 1805. Their marriage was properly witnessed and bonded by the white bondsman, Marcus C. Stephen, for the purpose of again petitioning the State General Assembly in order to establish that his family had "all the rights and privileges of freedom, as though they and each of them had been born free". They had nine children together, among whom were Charles Stewart Stanly, John Florence Stanly, Kitty (Catherine) Green Stanly, Eunice Carruthers Stanly, and Alexander Stewart Stanly, and educator John Stuart (Stewart) Stanley, who changed the spelling of his middle name and added the original "e" back to his last name that his grandfather removed for unknown reasons. John S. Stanley was also the father of Sara G. Stanley and Stanly gave her the middle name from his Stanly adopted family.

Together, John and Kitty became one of the founding families who established the First Presbyterian Church in New Bern in 1817. In the church registry, Kitty is named specifically as one of the thirteen people who gave funds to Scottish craftsman Robert Hay, who built and designed the church; which is still active in its community today. They would attend this church every Sunday and sit in one of two pews they owned. Stanly used his and Kitty's family connections to pass on and share deeds of property to such a degree that Schweninger declared Stanly as "the head of a black family and kinship network that included some of the most prominent whites and industrious slaves and free black[s] in Craven County."

Sometime in the 1820s Stanly's wife Kitty came down with an unknown illness that caused her to suffer for many years. When he emancipated two of his wife's caretakers, he wrote in their papers that Kitty was "unable to render to herself any assistance" and was "dependent during all said time on the kindness of [nurses Nancy and Money]." After as long as possibly ten years of "arduous and menial" work, Stanly freed these women upon the death of his wife.

During the same time of his wife's illness, Stanly came to the aid of his half-brother when he became financially exposed due to his own negligence. In the late 1820s, as president of the Bank of New Bern, John Stanly Jr. "failed to call loans in on time, overextended the bank's note issue, and used bank funds to buy and sell stock subscriptions, discount notes, and cotton." During this time, perhaps from the strain, John Stanly Jr. suffered a paralytic stroke. Schweninger believed out of "a sense of personal loyalty," Stanly countersigned a "security bond" for his half brother for the amount of $14,962, a considerable amount of money at the time, offering "as collateral a large portion of his estate." This overextended John Stanly Jr. and "with a few strokes of his pen, he was forced to jeopardize the acquisitions of a lifetime." The bank eventually was forced to close and Stanly lost much of the contributions, forcing him to sell several of his properties including many slaves. The national depression of the 1830s compounded his financial losses; however, even into his sixties, he provided funds toward emancipating slaves while at the same time maintaining slavery on his properties.

== Death ==
By the time Stanly had entered his seventies, he was only able to hold on to a few tracts of land on which he ran a small plantation composed of seven slaves. However, upon his death in 1846, his reputation remained as high as ever. He was considered by many of his white neighbors to be no different from them.
